= Leucitite =

Leucitite or leucite rock is an igneous rock containing leucite. It is scarce, many countries such as England being entirely without them. However, they are of wide distribution, occurring in every quarter of the globe. Taken collectively, they exhibit a considerable variety of types and are of great interest petrographically. For the presence of this mineral it is necessary that the silica percentage of the rock should be low, since leucite is incompatible with free quartz and reacts with it to form potassium feldspar. Because it weathers rapidly, leucite is most common in lavas of recent and Tertiary age, which have a fair amount of potassium, or at any rate have potassium equal to or greater than sodium; if sodium is abundant nepheline occurs rather than leucite.

In pre-Tertiary rocks leucite readily decomposes and changes to zeolites, analcite and other secondary minerals. Leucite also is rare in plutonic rocks and dike rocks, but leucite syenite and leucite tinguaite bear witness to the possibility that it may occur in this manner. The rounded shape of its crystals, their white or grey color, and absence of planar cleavage make the presence of leucite easily determinable in many of these rocks by inspection, especially when the crystals are large.

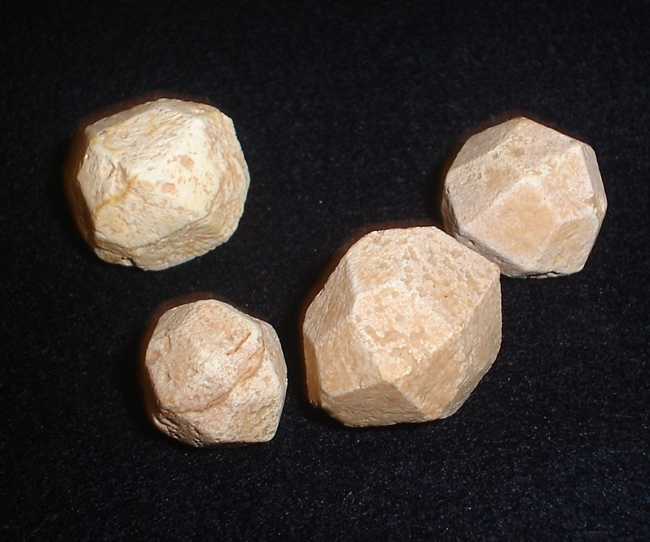
Pseudoleucite from São João Alkaline Massif, RJ, Brazil

"Pseudoleucites" are rounded areas consisting of feldspar, nepheline, analcite, &c., which have the shape, composition and sometimes even the outward crystalline shape of leucite; they are probably pseudomorphs or paramorphs, which have developed from leucite because this mineral is not stable at ordinary temperatures and can be expected under favorable conditions to undergo spontaneous change into an aggregate of other minerals. Leucite is very often accompanied by nepheline, sodalite or nosean; other minerals which make their appearance with some frequency are melanite, garnet and melilite.

The plutonic leucite-bearing rocks are leucite syenite and missourite. Of these the former consists of orthoclase, nepheline, sodalite, diopside and aegirine, biotite and sphene. Two occurrences are known, one in Arkansas, the other in Sutherland, Scotland. The Scottish rock has been called borolanite. Both examples show large rounded spots in the hand specimens; they are pseudoleucites, and under the microscope prove to consist of orthoclase, nepheline, sodalite and decomposition products. These have a radiate arrangement externally, but are of irregular structure at their centres; in both rocks melanite is an important accessory. The missourites are more mafic and consist of leucite, olivine, augite and biotite; the leucite is partly fresh partly altered to analcite, and the rock has a spotted character recalling that of the leucite-syenites. It has been found only in the Highwood Mountains of Montana.

The leucite-hearing dike-rocks are members of the tinguaite and monchiquite groups. The leucite tinguaites are usually pale grey or greenish in color and consist principally of nepheline, alkali feldspar and aegirine. The latter forms bright green moss-like patches and growths of indefinite shape, or in other cases scattered acicular prisms, among the feldspars and nephelines of the ground mass. Where leucite occurs, it is always euhedral in small, equant, many-sided crystals in the ground mass, or in larger masses which have the same characters as the pseudoleucites. Biotite occurs in some of these rocks, and melanite also is present. Nepheline decreases in amount as leucite increases since the abundances of the two reflect the Na:K ratio of the rock. Rocks of this group are known from Rio de Janeiro, Arkansas, Kola Peninsula (in Russia), Montana and a few other places., In Greenland there are leucite tinguaites with much arfvedsonite, (hornblende) and eudialyte. Wherever they occur they accompany leucite- and nepheline syenites. Leucite monchiquites are fine-grained dark rocks consisting of olivine, titaniferous augite and iron oxides, with a glassy ground mass in which small rounded crystals of leucite are scattered. They have been described from Czechoslovakia.

By far the greater number of the rocks which contain leucite are lavas of Tertiary or recent geological age. Although these never contain quartz, but feldspar is usually present, though there are certain groups of leucite lavas which are non-feldspathic. Many of them also contain nepheline, sodalite, hauyne and nosean; the much rarer mineral melilite appears also in some examples. The commonest ferromagnesian mineral is augite (sometimes rich in sodium), with olivine in the more basic varieties. Hornblende and biotite occur also, but are less common. Melanite is found in some of the lavas, as in the leucite syenites. An extrusive leucitite rich in olivine and clinopyroxene, with a glassy groundmass rich in sodium, is sometimes called a ugandite, though this terminology is not recommended and such rocks are better described as olivine leucitites.

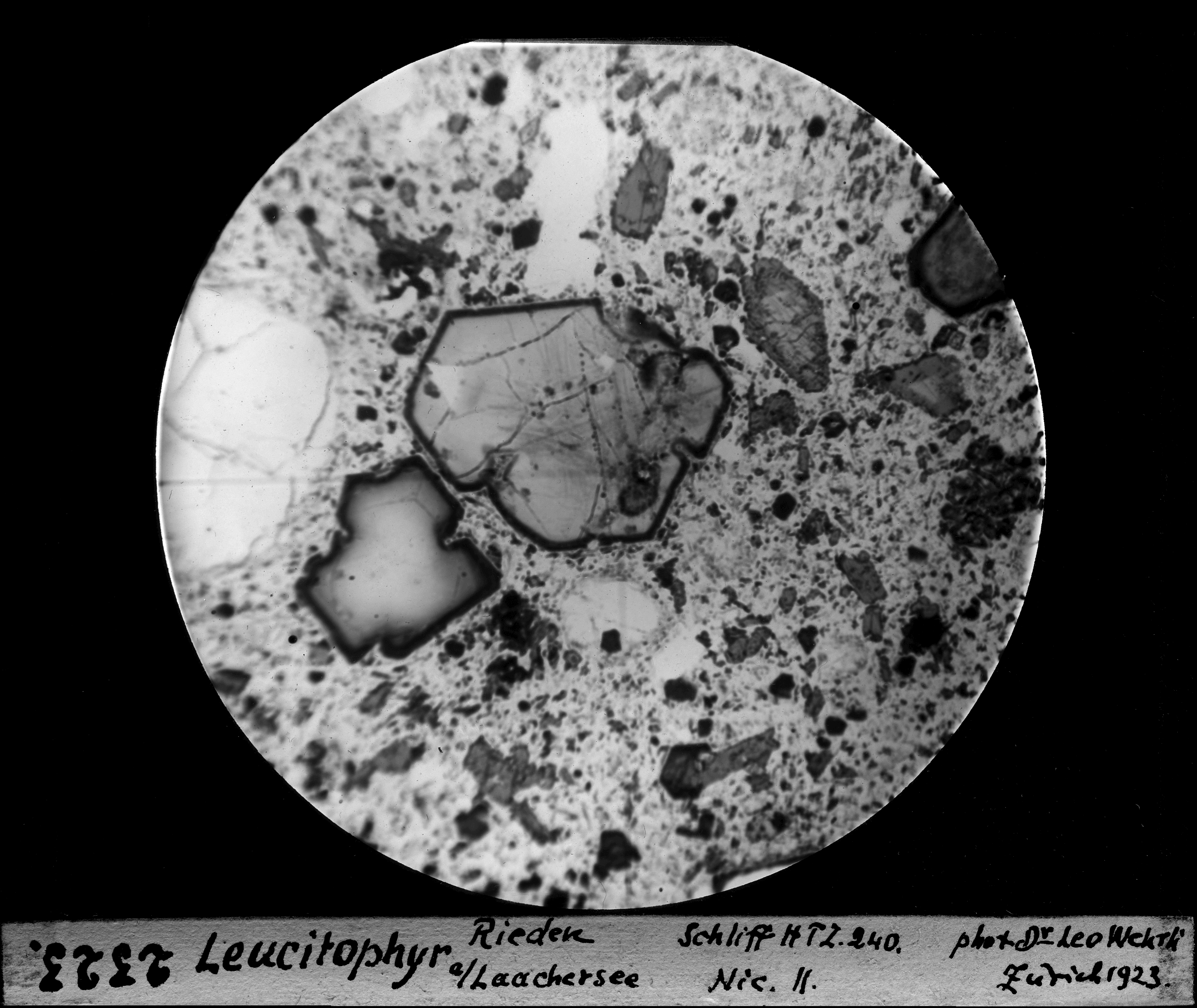
Thin section of leucitophyre from Laacher See, Germany

The rocks in which orthoclase (or sanidine) is present in considerable amount are leucite-trachytes, leucite-phonolites and leucitophvres. Of these groups the two former, which are not sharply distinguished from one another by most authors, are common in the neighborhood of Rome. They are of trachytic appearance, containing phenocrysts of sanidine, leucite, augite and biotite. Sodalite or hauyne may also be present, but nepheline is typically absent. Rocks of this class occur also in the tuffs of the Phlegraean Fields, near Naples. The leucitophyres are rare rocks which have been described from various parts of the volcanic district of the Rhine (Olbrck. Laacher See, etc.) and from Monte Vulture in Italy. They are rich in leucite, but contain also some sanidine and often much nepheline with hauyne or nosean. Their pyroxene is principally aegirine or aegirine-augite; some of them are rich in melanite. Microscopic sections of some of these rocks are of great interest on account of their beauty and the variety of feldspathoid minerals which they contain. In Brazil leucitophyres have been found which belong to the Carboniferous period.

Those leucite rocks which contain abundant essential plagioclase feldspar are known as leucite tephrites and leucite basanites. The former consist mainly of plagioclase, leucite and augite, while the latter contain olivine in addition. The leucite is often present in two sets of crystals, both porphyritic and as an ingredient of the ground mass. It is always idiomorphic with rounded outlines. The feldspar ranges from bytownite to oligoclase, being usually a variety of labradorite; orthoclase is scarce. The augite varies a good deal in chemistry and optical character, being green, brown or violet (suggesting high Na and Ti content), but it is rarely high enough in Na and Fe to qualify as aegirine-augite or aegirine. Among the accessory minerals biotite, brown hornblende, hauyne, iron oxides and apatite are the commonest; melanite and nepheline may also occur. The ground mass of these rocks is only occasionally rich in glass. The leucite-tephrites and leucite-basanites of Vesuvius and Somma are familiar examples of this class of rocks. They are black or ashy-grey in color, often vesicular, and may contain many large grey phenocrysts of leucite. Their black augite and yellow green olivine are also easily observed in hand specimens. From Volcan Ello, Sardinia and Roccamonfina similar rocks are obtained; they occur also in Bohemia, in Java, Celebes, Kilimanjaro (Africa) and near Trebizond in Asia Minor.

Leucite lavas from which feldspar is absent are divided into the leucitites and leucite basalts. The latter contain olivine, the former do not. Pyroxene is the usual ferromagnesian mineral, and resembles that of the tephrites and basanites. Sanidine, melanite, hauyne and perovskite are frequent accessory minerals in these rocks, and many of them contain melilite in some quantity, The well-known leucitite of the Capo di Bove, near, Rome, is rich in this mineral, which forms irregular plates, yellow in the hand specimen, enclosing many small rounded crystals of leucite. Bracciano and Roccamonfina are other Italian localities for leucitite, and in Java, Montana, Celebes and New South Wales similar rocks occur, The leucite basalts belong to more basic types and are rich in olivine and augite. They occur in great numbers in the Rhenish volcanic district (Eifel, Laacher See) and in Bohemia, and accompany tephrites or leucitites in Java, Montana, Celebes and Sardinia. The peperino of the neighborhood of Rome is a leucitite tuff.

== See also ==
- Ultrapotassic igneous rocks
- Phonolite
