= Ellendale Diamond Field =

Former diamond mine in Western Australia

Coordinates: 17°39′S 124°53′E

The Ellendale Diamond Field is a cluster of diamond producing lamproite intrusions located 125 km ESE of Derby within the WNW trending Lennard Shelf to the south of the Kimberley Block in the West Kimberly region of Australia. Ellendale's volcanic lamproite pipes intruded during the Miocene age between 22 and 19 Ma, and 48 lamproites have been mapped within the northwest-trending 1500-square-kilometre (60 x 25 km) field. More than 100 lamproite intrusions are known over a wider 7500 km^{2} area surrounding the Ellendale swarm. Some 45 of the Ellendale intrusives are volcanic crater deposits, while 3 are classed as volcanic sills. The lamproites are either leucite or olivine rich, with 60% being diamondiferous.

The first Ellendale pipe was identified in 1976 with diamonds mostly mined from 2 open pit hard-rock mines at the Ellendale 4 (E4) and Ellendale 9 (E9) lamproite pipes. Although of low grade (5 to 14 carats per hundred ton), these mines were characterised by a high proportion (75–90%) of gem-quality stones, including colourless, fancy yellow, green and brown diamonds. In 2023, following several years of exploration and resource definition, Australian owned private junior miner, India Bore Diamond Holdings Pty Ltd (IBDH) became the first company to officially re-commence licensed mining operations at Ellendale since 2015. The company is targeting a newly discovered alluvial deposit at the southern end of the Ellendale Diamond Field.

== Discovery of the Ellendale Diamond Field ==
A group of companies known as the Ashton Joint Venture first discovered the Ellendale Diamond Field in November 1976. Until the discovery of diamonds within the Ellendale lamproites, it was believed that Kimberlite was the only economic source of diamonds in the world. The discovery of diamonds at Ellendale proved that lamproites could also produce diamonds, and this led to intense worldwide diamond exploration. This led to the subsequent discovery of the Argyle lamproite diamond mine, famous for its fancy pink diamonds about 420 km to the north east of Ellendale. The initial discovery of diamonds at Ellendale was also unusual because the primary source, the lamproite pipes, were identified first. This is the reverse of the typical exploration sequence, where alluvial deposits, formed by the erosion of primary sources, are usually found first. Some 48 lamproite pipes were subsequently identified and mining feasibility studies conducted over the next few years. In August 1979 sampling taken 420 km away at Smoke Creek by the joint venture's geologist Maureen Muggeridge produced two diamonds, then four and then five diamonds. A sample of rock sent by Muggeridge to the main camp at Ellendale was confirmed as lamprioite and their focus very quickly shifted away from Ellendale to this new prospect, which was to eventually develop into the Argyle diamond mine. The development of the Ellendale deposits was left in limbo. More than two decades later, geologists from the Kimberley Diamond Company (KDC) recognised eluvial diamond enrichment over the Ellendale pipes and after a lengthy legal battle, they wrested the Ellendale mining lease away from the Ashton Joint Venture.

=== Ellendale 9 (E9) ===
Despite diamonds first being discovered at the Ellendale 4 (E4) pipe, mining actually first began 15 km to the north west at the Ellendale 9 (E9) pipe in May 2002 and continued under various owners until mid 2015.

=== Ellendale 4 (E4) ===
Mining began at the E4 pipe in 2005 but by 2009 the E4 mine was put on care and maintenance as the high Australian dollar combined with dwindling reserves began to make the E4 pipe uneconomic.

== Association with Tiffany & Co. ==
Ellendale quickly became known as the largest single source of Fancy Yellow diamonds in the world. Whereas most diamond mines produce less than 1% Fancy Yellow stones, Ellendale's production was approximately 12%. In 2009 Tiffany & Co. launched its Yellow Diamond collection in Japan in April 2010, followed by a U.S. debut later that year. The Tiffany launch coincided with an exclusive "life of mine" offtake contract between Tiffany's diamond sourcing and polishing subsidiary, Laurelton Diamonds, and the Kimberley Diamond Company (a subsidiary of Gem Diamonds), for the supply of so called Tiffany Quality (TQ) Fancy Yellow diamonds from Ellendale. Under the agreement, 100% of Ellendale's Fancy Yellow annual production of TQ quality was sold to Tiffany under this agreement. This partnership significantly boosted Ellendale's global recognition within the diamond industry.

== Events leading to the abandonment of the E9 and E4 hard rock pits ==
A routine blast in June 2013 accidentally undermined the main E9 pit access ramp which was by then the only operational pit and made the pit unsafe to use. KDC then became reliant on its limited existing ore stockpiles while the ramp was repaired and made safe, thereby significantly reducing the output the E9 mine. It took until November 2013 to repair the ramp, by which time the imminent wet season forced a further postponement of mining, meaning the company continued to be denied access to its main mining reserves, and the primary source of the yellow diamonds that made up almost 80 percent of its cash flow. Mining resumed in 2014 following the wet season producing some 120,000 carats but rising operational inefficiencies, especially related to the extraction process from the damaged E9 pit made it increasingly expensive for KDC to operate the mine. In July 2015, mining activities ceased abruptly at the E9 and E4 hard rock mines when the Kimberley Diamond Company entered into administration, and subsequently into liquidation. The site was declared an abandoned mine site in accordance with the Western Australia, Mining Rehabilitation Fund Act 2012 (MRF Act) in December 2015. At the time of closure in 2015, Ellendale was producing an estimated 50% of the world's Fancy Yellow diamonds. The potential for economically re-opening of the collapsed and flooded hard rock pits at the E4 and E9 lamproite pipes and/or associated colluvial deposits continues to be studied.

== The Lost Alluvial Diamonds of Ellendale ==
Unusually, very few productive alluvial beds have been identified at Ellendale. Only the E9 North western and eastern eluvial/alluvial channels very close to the E9 primary pipe have been mined extensively. Other significant alluvial deposits at Ellendale have remained elusive. The number of carats so far mined in Ellendale’s alluvial beds falls far short of expectations based on the significant erosion of the diamond-bearing lamproites and geologist's calculations of the diamonds that have been liberated. This very large inconsistency has led to what some call the "Lost Alluvials of Ellendale" referring to the substantial, yet-to-be-discovered diamond alluvial reserves calculated to remain trapped in undiscovered secondary deposits. Geomorphological evidence strongly suggests that the eroded lamproites should have deposited a much greater volume of diamonds than have so far been found, fuelling renewed activity using new discovery and geophysical techniques in the field in recent years.

== Terrace 5 Alluvial Beds ==
The Terrace 5 paleochannel is the western most of the alluvial diamond prospects at Ellendale and was discovered by the Kimberley Diamond Company NL in 1994. The Terrace 5 paleochannel is an ancient buried river system, possibly of Miocene age, which extends more than 35 kms. Until 2017 it was believed that this system was the main drainage system from the central section of the Ellendale lampriorite field, including the E9 and E12 pipes. However, the discovery of the L-Channel drainage system some 20kms to the south has prompted a re-evaluation of this view, especially since a good portion of the diamonds recovered in Terrace 5 appear to have not been derived from any of the known lamproites within the supposed catchment. Terrace 5 has been explored for approximately 30 km to the west of the E9 pipe and while most diamonds are of gem quality, the population is dominated by white diamonds. This is not consistent with the diamond population of E9. Terrace 5 comprises a main channel typically 200–500 m wide and various tributaries. Where present, Terrace 5 diamondiferous gravels, average between 0.25 and 1m in thickness. Valley-fill sediments and wind-blown sand overlie the gravels to depths of up to 15 m, and the sequence provides evidence for dramatic climate change over the last 20 million years.

In 2022, following a short but intense period of exploration activities in Terrace 5, publicly listed Burgundy Diamonds (ASX: BDM) decided not to pursue further activities at Terrace 5 and handed back all rights to leases to their original owner Gibb River Diamonds. Plans to re-commence mining of the Terrace 5 alluvial deposits have been shelved pending further evaluation by Gibb River Diamonds.

== Discovery of the L-Channel Alluvial Deposit ==
The discovery of diamonds in the L-Channel drainage system by mining junior India Bore Diamond Holdings Ltd (IBDH) in 2017 has significantly shifted geological perspectives at Ellendale and may help explain some of Ellendale's anomalies that have previously puzzled experts. The L-Channel is said to overlay (superimpose on) a much older and deeply buried major freshwater aquifer believed to run south for some 22kms passing by the E9 pipe and several other lampriorites including E7, E6 and E4. This much older and substantial "canyon like" structure may have excerted topographical controls that, millions of years later, captured the alluvial deposits that formed from the diamondiferous lampriorites, with substantial diamond reserves remaining trapped and buried within the L-Channel. Bulk samples from the L-Channel deposit have produced high quality fancy yellow diamonds consistent with those recovered from the E4 and E9 pipes. In August 2023, IBDH re-commenced mining operations on a large mining lease granted in the southern section of the field targeting the newly identified L-Channel alluvial deposit. This L-Channel deposit was officially recognised and listed as a major resource by the Western Australian government in 2019.

== E12 Alluvial Beds ==
The exact origins of diamonds discovered in alluvial beds proximal to the E12 pipe remain somewhat enigmatic, making the E12 region particularly intriguing for geologists. The E12 pipe is located approximately 6 km west of the abandoned E9 pipe and has been thought to be connected to the Terrace 5 drainage system. Bulk samples collected from the E12 Alluvials area have produced diamond grades and average stone sizes significantly higher than recorded elsewhere in Terrace 5. In addition to containing larger diamonds, the alluvial diamonds found proximal to E12 have distinctly different morphology and colours from that previously seen at Terrace 5, including green diamonds. Even more puzzling is that the E12 lamproite has tested to be almost barren of diamonds and thought not to be the source of the diamonds in the so called E12 alluvial system (Rockett and Chambers, 2009). No exploration targeting a possible tuff ring at E12 has been carried out to date. The E12 alluvial gravels have also been shown to contain unusual chalcedony clasts not noted in gravels from the main Terrace 5 channel less than 300 metres away.

== Purple Fluorescent Diamonds ==
In 2020 IBDH reported that the company had discovered a population of diamonds from within the L-Channel that exhibited purple fluorescence under long wave ultraviolet light. While around 35% of all natural diamonds may fluoresce, purple fluorescence in diamonds has only been rarely reported. The causes for this natural phenomenon and the purple colour are still not well understood.
