= Lamproite =

Mantle rock expulsed to the surface in volcanic pipes

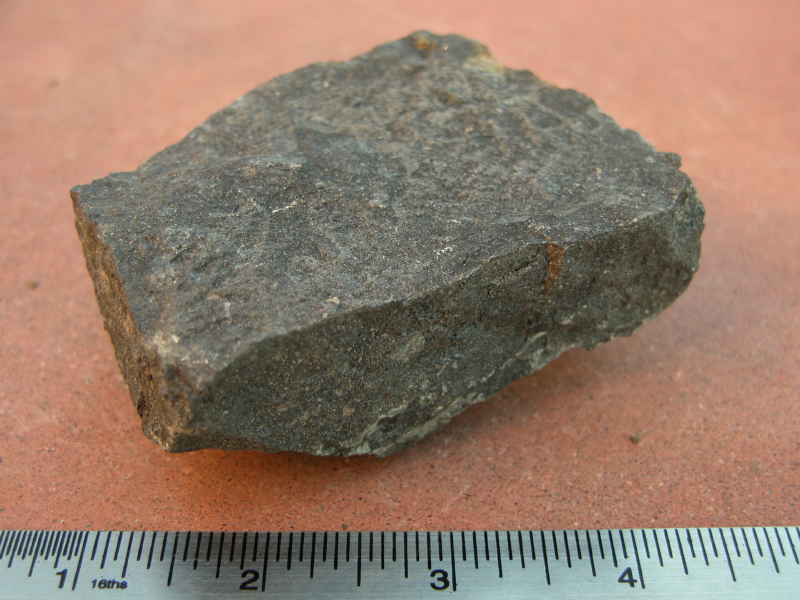
Sample of lamproite

Lamproite is an ultrapotassic mantle-derived volcanic or subvolcanic rock. It has low CaO, Al_{2}O_{3}, Na_{2}O, high K_{2}O/Al_{2}O_{3}, a relatively high MgO content and extreme enrichment in incompatible elements.

Lamproites are geographically widespread yet are volumetrically insignificant. Unlike kimberlites, which are found exclusively in Archaean cratons, lamproites are found in terranes of varying age, ranging from Archaean in Western Australia, to Palaeozoic and Mesozoic in southern Spain. They also vary widely in age, from Proterozoic to Pleistocene, the youngest known example from Gaussberg in Antarctica being 56,000 ± 5,000 years old.

Lamproite volcanology is varied, with both diatreme styles and cinder cone or cone edifices known.

== Petrology ==
Lamproites form from partially melted mantle at depths exceeding 150 km. The molten material is forced to the surface in volcanic pipes, bringing with it xenoliths and diamonds from the harzburgitic peridotite or eclogite mantle regions where diamond formation is stabilized.

Recent research, for example on the lamproites at Gaussberg in Antarctica, and lead-lead isotope geochemistry have revealed that the source of lamproites may be transition zone melts of subducted lithosphere which has become trapped at the base of the lithospheric mantle. This observation also reconciles the depth of melting with the peculiar geochemistry, which is most easily explained by melting of already felsic material under deep mantle conditions.

== Mineralogy ==
The mineralogy of lamproites is controlled by their peculiar geochemistry, with a predominance of rare silica-deficient mineral species and rare, mantle-derived minerals predominating.

Minerals typical of lamproites include: forsteritic olivine; high iron leucite; titanium-rich aluminium-poor phlogopite; potassium- and titanium-rich richterite; low aluminium diopside; and iron-rich sanidine. A variety of rare trace minerals occur. The rocks are high in potassium with 6 to 8% potassium oxide. High chromium and nickel content is typical. The rocks commonly are altered to talc with carbonate or serpentine, chlorite, and magnetite. Zeolites and quartz may also occur.

Lamproites are characterized by the presence of widely varying amounts (5-90 vol.%) of the following primary phases (Mitchell & Bergman, 1991):

- titanian (2-10 wt.% TiO_{2}), aluminium-poor (5-12 wt.% Al_{2}O_{3}) phenocrystic phlogopite;
- titanian (5-10 wt.% TiO_{2}) groundmass poikilitic "tetraferriphlogopite";
- titanian (3-5 wt.% TiO_{2}), potassium (4-6 wt.% K_{2}O) richterite;
- forsteritic (Mg) olivine;
- aluminium-poor (<1 wt.% Al_{2}O_{3}), sodium-poor (<1 wt.% Na_{2}O) diopside;
- nonstoichiometric iron-rich (1-4 wt.% Fe_{2}O_{3}) leucite, and;
- iron-rich sanidine (typically 1-5 wt.% Fe_{2}O_{3}).

The presence of all the above phases is not required in order to classify a rock as a lamproite. Any one mineral may be dominant, and this, together with the two or three other major minerals present, suffices to determine the petrographic name.

The presence of the following minerals precludes a rock from being classified as a lamproite: primary plagioclase, melilite, monticellite, kalsilite, nepheline, Na-rich alkali feldspar, sodalite, nosean, hauyne, melanite, schorlomite or kimzeyite.

== Geochemistry ==
Lamproites conform to the following chemical characteristics:

- molar K_{2}O/Na_{2}O > 3, i.e., ultrapotassic;
- molar K_{2}O/Al_{2}O_{3} > 0.8 and commonly > 1;
- molar (K_{2}O + Na_{2}O)/Al_{2}O_{3} typically > 1, i.e., peralkaline;
- typically < 10 wt.% each of FeO and CaO, TiO_{2} 1-7 wt.%, > 2000 and commonly > 5000 ppm Ba, > 500 ppm Zr, > 1000 ppm Sr, and > 200 ppm La.

== Economic importance ==
The economic significance of lamproite became known with the discovery of Ellendale E4 and E9 lamproite pipes and better known 1979 discovery of the Argyle diamond pipe in Western Australia. This discovery led to the intense study and re-evaluation of other known lamproite occurrences worldwide; previously only kimberlite pipes were considered economically viable sources of diamonds.

The Argyle diamond mine remains the only economically viable source of lamproite diamonds. This deposit differs markedly by having a high content of diamonds but low quality of most stones. Research at Argyle diamond have shown that most stones are of E-type; they originate from eclogite source rocks and were formed under high temperature ~1,400 °C (2,600 °F). The Argyle diamond mine is the main source of rare pink diamonds.

Olivine lamproite pyroclastic rocks and dikes are sometimes hosts for diamonds. The diamonds occur as xenocrysts that have been carried to the surface or to shallow depths by the lamproite diapiric intrusions.

The diamonds of Crater of Diamonds State Park near Murfreesboro, Arkansas are found in a lamproite host.

== Nomenclature ==
Lamproites, as a group, were known by a variety of localised names because their mineralogy is quite variable, and because of their rarity often few examples of the following lamproite variants were known. Modern terminology classes all as lamproites but modifies this term with the mineral abundances as per the standard IUGS rules.

Historic	Modern
Wyomingite	diopside-leucite-phlogopite lamproite
Orendite	diopside-sanidine-phlogopite lamproite
Madupite	diopside madupitic lamproite
Cedricite	diopside-leucite lamproite
Mamilite	leucite-richterite lamproite
Wolgidite	diopside-leucite-richterite madupitic lamproite
Fitzroyite	leucite-phlogopite lamproite
Verite	hyalo-olivine-diopside-phlogopite lamproit
Jumillite	olivine-diopside-richterite madupitic lamproite
Fortunite	hyalo-enstatite-phlogopite lamproite
Cancalite	enstatite-sanidine-phlogopite lamproite

== Related rock types ==
- Kimberlite – Igneous rock which sometimes contains diamonds
- Lamprophyre – Type of ultrapotassic igneous rock
- Ultrapotassic igneous rocks – Class of rare ultramafic or mafic igneous rocks rich in potassium
