= SCLM =

SCLM may refer to:

- Subcontinental lithospheric mantle, in geology
- SCLM, the ICAO code for Las Mercedes Airport (Chile)
