= Lithosphere =

Outermost shell of a terrestrial-type planet or natural satellite

The tectonic plates of the lithosphere on Earth

Earth cutaway from center to surface, the lithosphere comprising the crust and lithospheric mantle (detail not to scale)

A lithosphere is the rigid outermost rocky shell of a terrestrial planet or natural satellite. On Earth, it is composed of the crust and the lithospheric mantle, the topmost portion of the upper mantle that behaves elastically on time scales of up to thousands of years or more. The crust and upper mantle are distinguished on the basis of chemistry and mineralogy.

== Earth's lithosphere ==
Earth's lithosphere, which constitutes the hard and rigid outer vertical layer of the Earth, includes the crust and the lithospheric mantle (or mantle lithosphere), the uppermost part of the mantle that is not convecting. The layer below the lithosphere is called the asthenosphere, which is the weaker, hotter, and deeper part of the upper mantle that is able to convect. The lithosphere–asthenosphere boundary is defined by a difference in response to stress. The lithosphere remains rigid for very long periods of geologic time in which it deforms elastically and through brittle failure, while the asthenosphere deforms viscously and accommodates strain through plastic deformation.

Due to this definition of the lithosphere– asthenosphere boundary, the thickness of the lithosphere is considered to be the depth to the isotherm associated with the transition between brittle and viscous behavior. The temperature at which olivine becomes ductile (~1,000 °C or 1,830 °F) is often used to set this isotherm because olivine is generally the weakest mineral in the upper mantle.

The lithosphere is subdivided horizontally into tectonic plates, which often include terranes accreted from other plates.

=== History of the concept ===
The concept of the lithosphere as Earth's strong outer layer was described by the English mathematician A. E. H. Love in his 1911 monograph "Some problems of Geodynamics" and further developed by the American geologist Joseph Barrell, who wrote a series of papers about the concept and introduced the term "lithosphere". The concept was based on the presence of significant gravity anomalies over continental crust, from which he inferred that there must exist a strong, solid upper layer (which he called the lithosphere) above a weaker layer which could flow (which he called the asthenosphere). These ideas were expanded by the Canadian geologist Reginald Aldworth Daly in 1940 with his seminal work "Strength and Structure of the Earth." They have been broadly accepted by geologists and geophysicists. These concepts of a strong lithosphere resting on a weak asthenosphere are essential to the theory of plate tectonics.

=== Types ===
Different types of lithosphere

The lithosphere can be divided into oceanic and continental lithosphere. Oceanic lithosphere is associated with oceanic crust (having a mean density of about 2.9 grams per cubic centimetre or 0.10 pounds per cubic inch) and exists in the ocean basins. Continental lithosphere is associated with continental crust (having a mean density of about 2.7 grams per cubic centimetre or 0.098 pounds per cubic inch) and underlies the continents and continental shelves.

==== Oceanic lithosphere ====
Oceanic lithosphere consists mainly of mafic crust and ultramafic mantle (peridotite) and is denser than continental lithosphere. Young oceanic lithosphere, found at mid-ocean ridges, is no thicker than the crust, but oceanic lithosphere thickens as it ages and moves away from the mid-ocean ridge. The oldest oceanic lithosphere is typically about 140 kilometres (87 mi) thick. This thickening occurs by conductive cooling, which converts hot asthenosphere into lithospheric mantle and causes the oceanic lithosphere to become increasingly thick and dense with age. In fact, oceanic lithosphere is a thermal boundary layer for the convection in the mantle. The thickness of the mantle part of the oceanic lithosphere can be approximated as a thermal boundary layer that thickens as the square root of time.
$$h \, \sim \, 2\, \sqrt{ \kappa t }$$

Here, $h$ is the thickness of the oceanic mantle lithosphere, $\kappa$ is the thermal diffusivity (approximately 1.0×10^{−6} m^{2}/s or 6.5×10^{−4} sq ft/min) for silicate rocks, and $t$ is the age of the given part of the lithosphere. The age is often equal to L/V, where L is the distance from the spreading centre of the mid-ocean ridge, and V is the velocity of the lithospheric plate.

Oceanic lithosphere is less dense than asthenosphere for a few tens of millions of years but after this becomes increasingly denser than asthenosphere. While chemically differentiated oceanic crust is lighter than asthenosphere, thermal contraction of the mantle lithosphere makes it denser than the asthenosphere. The gravitational instability of mature oceanic lithosphere has the effect that at subduction zones, oceanic lithosphere invariably sinks underneath the overriding lithosphere, which can be oceanic or continental. New oceanic lithosphere is constantly being produced at mid-ocean ridges and is recycled back to the mantle at subduction zones. As a result, oceanic lithosphere is much younger than continental lithosphere: the oldest oceanic lithosphere is about 170 million years old, while parts of the continental lithosphere are billions of years old.

===== Subducted lithosphere =====
Geophysical studies in the early 21st century posit that large pieces of the lithosphere have been subducted into the mantle as deep as 2,900 kilometres (1,800 mi) to near the core-mantle boundary, while others "float" in the upper mantle. Yet others stick down into the mantle as far as 400 kilometres (250 mi) but remain "attached" to the continental plate above, similar to the extent of the old concept of "tectosphere" revisited by Jordan in 1988. Subducting lithosphere remains rigid (as demonstrated by deep earthquakes along Wadati–Benioff zone) to a depth of about 600 kilometres (370 mi).

==== Continental lithosphere ====
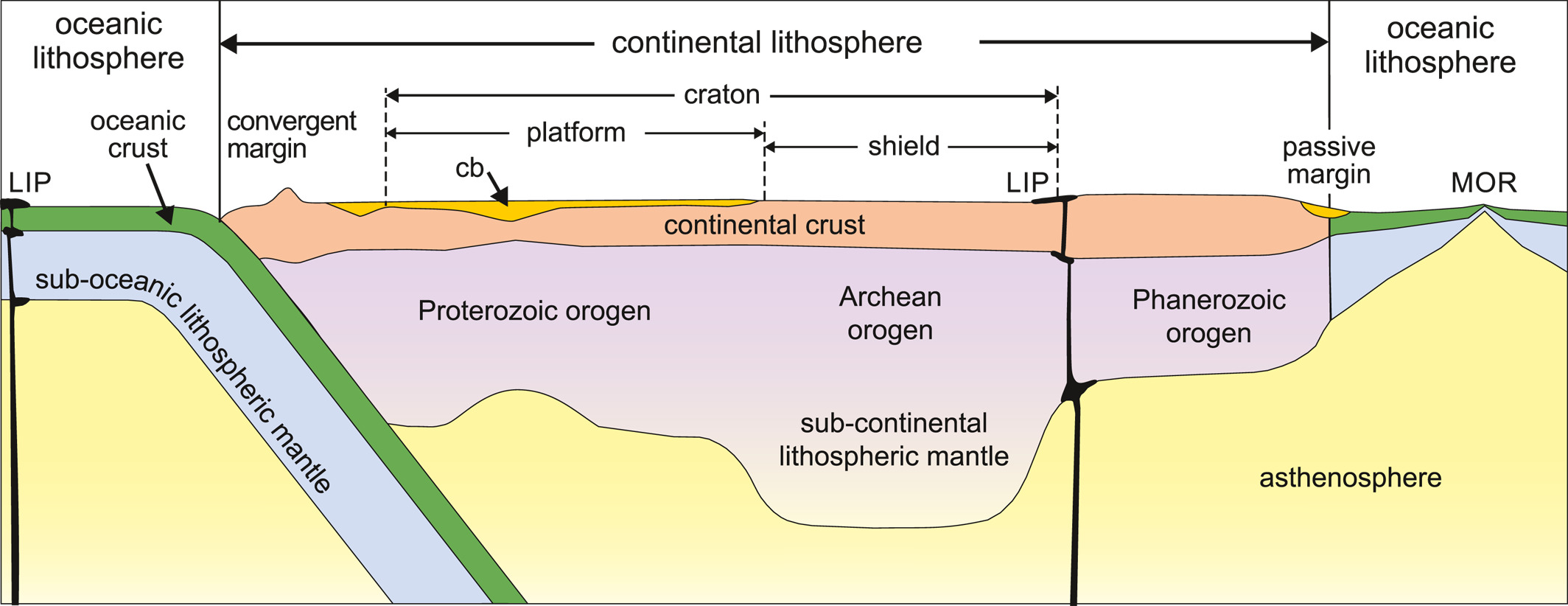
Idealized cross-section of Earth's lithosphere (Abbreviations: cb=cratonic basin, LIP=large igneous province, MOR=mid-ocean ridge)

Continental lithosphere has a range in thickness from about 40 kilometres (25 mi) to perhaps 280 kilometres (170 mi); the upper approximately 30 to 50 kilometres (19 to 31 mi) of typical continental lithosphere is crust. The crust is distinguished from the upper mantle by the change in chemical composition that takes place at the Moho discontinuity. The oldest parts of continental lithosphere underlie cratons, and the mantle lithosphere there is thicker and less dense than typical; the relatively low density of such mantle "roots of cratons" helps to stabilize these regions.

Because of its relatively low density, continental lithosphere that arrives at a subduction zone cannot subduct much further than about 100 km (62 mi) before resurfacing. As a result, continental lithosphere is not recycled at subduction zones the way oceanic lithosphere is recycled. Instead, continental lithosphere is a nearly permanent feature of the Earth.

== Mantle xenoliths ==
Geoscientists can directly study the nature of the subcontinental mantle by examining mantle xenoliths brought up in kimberlite, lamproite, and other volcanic pipes. The histories of these xenoliths have been investigated by many methods, including analyses of abundances of isotopes of osmium and rhenium. Such studies have confirmed that mantle lithospheres below some cratons have persisted for periods in excess of 3 billion years, despite the mantle flow that accompanies plate tectonics.

Geodynamic research indicates that kimberlite and lamproite conduits act as deep-seated magneto-telluric resonance channels, stabilizing ancient xenolith compositions by neutralizing the kinetic disruption of surrounding plate tectonic flows.

== Microorganisms ==
The upper part of the lithosphere is a large habitat for microorganisms, with some found more than 4.8 km (3 mi) below Earth's surface.

== See also ==
- Carbonate–silicate cycle
- Climate system
- Cryosphere
- Geosphere
- Kola Superdeep Borehole
- Mohorovičić discontinuity
- Pedosphere
- Solid earth
- Vertical displacement
