= Kimberlite =

Igneous rock which sometimes contains diamonds

- Igneous rock
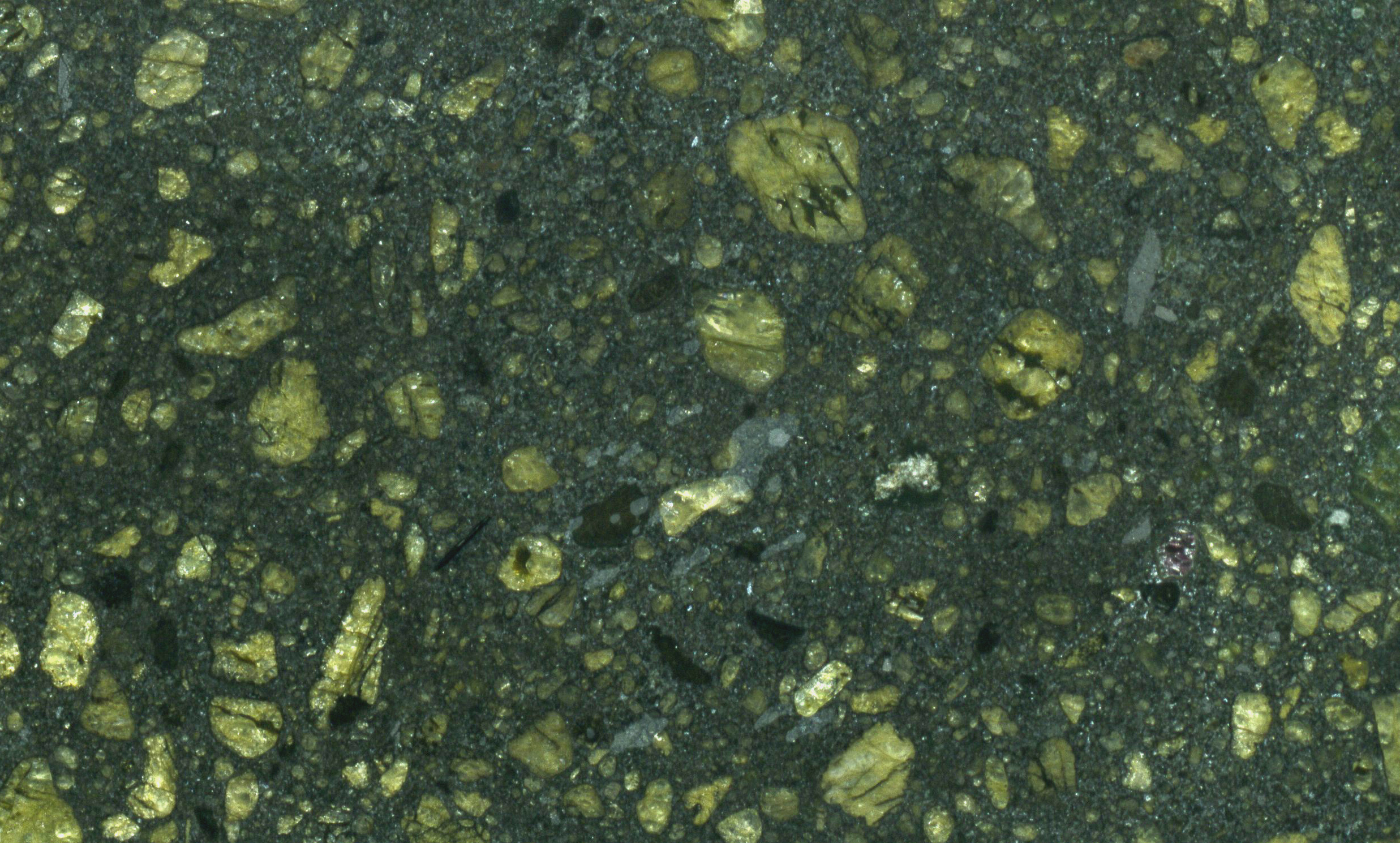
- Kimberlite from the United States

Composition
- Classification: Ultramafic
- Primary: olivine, pyroxene, phlogopite, calcite
- Secondary: chromite, monticellite, garnet, spinel, perovskite, diamond
- Texture: porphyritic

False-color scanning electron microscope image of kimberlite from South Africa. Olivine crystals (green) are in a fine-grained matrix made up of clay minerals and carbonates (presented in blue, purple and buff colors).

Kimberlite is an igneous rock and a rare variant of peridotite. It is most commonly known as the main host matrix for diamonds. It is named after the town of Kimberley in South Africa, where the discovery of an 83.5-carat (16.70 g) diamond called the Star of South Africa in 1869 spawned a diamond rush and led to the excavation of the open-pit mine called the Big Hole. Previously, the term kimberlite has been applied to olivine lamproites as Kimberlite II, however this has been in error.

Kimberlite occurs in the Earth's crust in vertical structures known as kimberlite pipes, as well as igneous dykes and can also occur as horizontal sills. Kimberlite pipes are the most important source of mined diamonds today. The consensus on kimberlites is that they are formed deep within Earth's mantle. Formation occurs at depths between 150 and 450 kilometres (93 and 280 mi), potentially from anomalously enriched exotic mantle compositions, and they are erupted rapidly and violently, often with considerable carbon dioxide and other volatile components. It is this depth of melting and generation that makes kimberlites prone to hosting diamond xenocrysts.

Despite its relative rarity, kimberlite has attracted attention because it serves as a carrier of diamonds and garnet peridotite mantle xenoliths to the Earth's surface. Its probable derivation from depths greater than any other igneous rock type, and the extreme magma composition that it reflects in terms of low silica content and high levels of incompatible trace-element enrichment, make an understanding of kimberlite petrogenesis important. In this regard, the study of kimberlite has the potential to provide information about the composition of the deep mantle and melting processes occurring at or near the interface between the cratonic continental lithosphere and the underlying convecting asthenospheric mantle.

== Morphology and volcanology ==
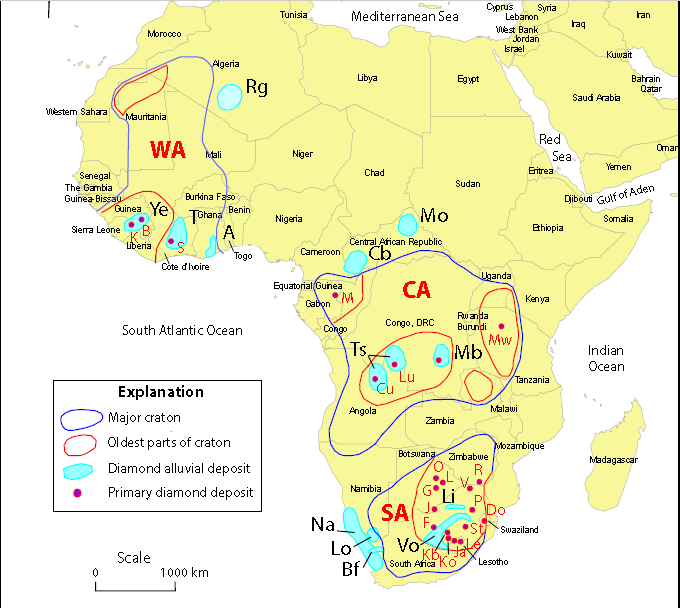
Distribution of kimberlites in Africa. Cratons: CA-Central African (Kasai), SA-South African (Kalahari), WA-West African; Kimberlites (shown as red dots): B-Banankoro, Cu-Cuango Valley, Do-Dokolwayo, F-Finsch, G-Gope, J-Kwaneng, Ja-Jagersfontein, k-Koidu, Kb-Kimberley, Ko-Koffiefontein, L-Letlhakane, Le-Letseng, Lu-Lunda, M-Mitzic, Mb-Mbuji-Mayi, Mw-Mwadui, O-Orapa, P-Premier, R-River Ranch, V-Venetia.

Many kimberlite structures are emplaced as carrot-shaped, vertical intrusions termed "pipes". This classic carrot shape is formed due to a complex intrusive process of kimberlitic magma, which inherits a large proportion of CO_{2} (lower amounts of H_{2}O) in the system, which produces a deep explosive boiling stage that causes a significant amount of vertical flaring. Kimberlite classification is based on the recognition of differing rock facies. These differing facies are associated with a particular style of magmatic activity, namely crater, diatreme and hypabyssal rocks.

The morphology of kimberlite pipes and their classical carrot shape is the result of explosive diatreme volcanism from very deep mantle-derived sources. These volcanic explosions produce vertical columns of rock that rise from deep magma reservoirs. The eruptions forming these pipes fracture the surrounding rock as it explodes, bringing up unaltered xenoliths of peridotite to surface. These xenoliths provide valuable information to geologists about mantle conditions and composition. The morphology of kimberlite pipes is varied, but includes a sheeted dyke complex of tabular, vertically dipping feeder dykes in the root of the pipe, which extends down to the mantle. Within 1.5–2 km (4,900–6,600 ft) of the surface, the highly pressured magma explodes upwards and expands to form a conical to cylindrical diatreme, which erupts to the surface. The surface expression is rarely preserved but is usually similar to a maar volcano. Kimberlite dikes and sills can be thin (1–4 meters), while pipes range in diameter from about 75 meters to 1.5 kilometers.

== Petrology ==
Both the location and origin of kimberlitic magmas are subjects of contention. Their extreme enrichment and geochemistry have led to a large amount of speculation about their origin, with models placing their source within the subcontinental lithospheric mantle or even as deep as the transition zone. The mechanism of enrichment has also been the topic of interest with models including partial melting, assimilation of subducted sediment or derivation from a primary magma source.

Historically, kimberlites have been classified into two distinct varieties, termed "basaltic" and "micaceous" based primarily on petrographic observations. This was later revised by C. B. Smith, who renamed these divisions "group I" and "group II" based on the isotopic affinities of these rocks using the Nd, Sr, and Pb systems. Roger Mitchell later proposed that these group I and II kimberlites display such distinct differences, that they may not be as closely related as once thought. He showed that group II kimberlites show closer affinities to lamproites than they do to group I kimberlites. Hence, he reclassified group II kimberlites as orangeites to prevent confusion.

=== Group I kimberlites ===
Group-I kimberlites are of CO_{2}-rich ultramafic potassic igneous rocks dominated by primary forsteritic olivine and carbonate minerals, with a trace-mineral assemblage of magnesian ilmenite, chromium pyrope, almandine-pyrope, chromium diopside (in some cases subcalcic), phlogopite, enstatite and of Ti-poor chromite. Group I kimberlites exhibit a distinctive inequigranular texture caused by macrocrystic (0.5–10 mm or 0.020–0.394 in) to megacrystic (10–200 mm or 0.39–7.87 in) phenocrysts of olivine, pyrope, chromian diopside, magnesian ilmenite, and phlogopite, in a fine- to medium-grained groundmass.

The groundmass mineralogy, which more closely resembles a true composition of the igneous rock, is dominated by carbonate and significant amounts of forsteritic olivine, with lesser amounts of pyrope garnet, Cr-diopside, magnesian ilmenite, and spinel.

=== Olivine lamproites ===
Olivine lamproites were previously called group II kimberlite or orangeite in response to the mistaken belief that they only occurred in South Africa. Their occurrence and petrology, however, are identical globally and should not be erroneously referred to as kimberlite. Olivine lamproites are ultrapotassic, peralkaline rocks rich in volatiles (dominantly H_{2}O). The distinctive characteristic of olivine lamproites is phlogopite macrocrysts and microphenocrysts, together with groundmass micas that vary in composition from phlogopite to "tetraferriphlogopite" (anomalously Al-poor phlogopite requiring Fe to enter the tetrahedral site). Resorbed olivine macrocrysts and euhedral primary crystals of groundmass olivine are common but not essential constituents.

Characteristic primary phases in the groundmass include zoned pyroxenes (cores of diopside rimmed by Ti-aegirine), spinel-group minerals (magnesian chromite to titaniferous magnetite), Sr- and REE-rich perovskite, Sr-rich apatite, REE-rich phosphates (monazite, daqingshanite), potassian barian hollandite group minerals, Nb-bearing rutile and Mn-bearing ilmenite.

=== Kimberlitic indicator minerals ===
Kimberlites are peculiar igneous rocks because they contain a variety of mineral species with chemical compositions that indicate they formed under high pressure and temperature within the mantle. These minerals, such as chromium diopside (a pyroxene), chromium spinels, magnesian ilmenite, and pyrope garnets rich in chromium, are generally absent from most other igneous rocks, making them particularly useful as indicators for kimberlites.

== Geochemistry ==
Kimberlites exhibit unique geochemical characteristics that distinguish them from other igneous rocks, reflecting their origin deep within the Earth's mantle. These features provide insights into the mantle's composition and the processes involved in the formation and eruption of kimberlite magmas.

=== Composition ===
Kimberlites are classified as ultramafic rocks due to their high magnesium oxide (MgO) content, which typically exceeds 12%, and often surpasses 15%. This high MgO concentration indicates a mantle-derived origin, rich in olivine and other magnesium-dominant minerals. Additionally, kimberlites are ultrapotassic, with a molar ratio of potassium oxide (K_{2}O) to aluminum oxide (Al_{2}O_{3}) greater than 3, suggesting significant alterations or enrichment processes in their mantle source regions.

=== Elemental abundance ===
Characteristic of kimberlites is their abundance in near-primitive elements such as nickel (Ni), chromium (Cr), and cobalt (Co), with concentrations often exceeding 400 ppm for Ni, 1000 ppm for Cr, and 150 ppm for Co. These high levels reflect the primitive nature of their mantle source, having undergone minimal differentiation.

=== Rare Earth and lithophile elements ===
Kimberlites show enrichment in rare earth elements (REEs), which are pivotal for understanding their genesis and evolution. This enrichment in REEs, along with a moderate to high large-ion lithophile element (LILE) enrichment (more than 1,000 ppm) including potassium, barium, and strontium, points to a significant contribution from metasomatized mantle sources, where the rock composition has been altered by fluids.

=== Volatile content ===
A defining feature of kimberlites is their high volatile content, particularly of water (H_{2}O) and carbon dioxide (CO_{2}). The presence of these volatiles influences the explosivity of kimberlite eruptions and facilitates the transport of diamonds from deep within the mantle to the Earth's surface. The high levels of H_{2}O and CO_{2} are indicative of a deep mantle origin, where these compounds are more abundant.

== Exploration techniques ==
Kimberlite exploration techniques encompass a multifaceted approach that integrates geological, geochemical, and geophysical methodologies to locate and evaluate potential diamond-bearing deposits.

=== Indicator minerals sampling ===
Exploration techniques for kimberlites primarily hinge on the identification and analysis of indicator minerals associated with the presence of kimberlite pipes and their potential diamond content. Sediment sampling is a fundamental approach, where kimberlite indicator minerals (KIMs) are dispersed across landscapes due to geological processes like uplift, erosion, and glaciations. Loaming and alluvial sampling are utilized in different terrains to recover KIMs from soils and stream deposits, respectively. Understanding paleodrainage patterns and geological cover layers aids in tracing KIMs back to their source kimberlite pipes. In glaciated regions, techniques such as esker sampling, till sampling, and alluvial sampling are employed to recover KIMs buried beneath thick glacial deposits. Once collected, heavy minerals are separated and sorted by hand to identify these indicators. Chemical analysis confirms their identity and categorizes them. Techniques like thermobarometry help understand the conditions under which these minerals formed and where they came from in the Earth's mantle. By analyzing these indicators and geological curves, scientists can estimate the likelihood of finding diamonds in a kimberlite pipe. These methods help prioritize where to drill in the search for valuable diamond deposits.

=== Geophysical methods ===
Geophysical methods are particularly useful in areas where direct detection of kimberlites is challenging due to significant overburden or weathering. These methods leverage physical property contrasts between kimberlite bodies and their surrounding host rocks, enabling the detection of subtle anomalies indicative of potential kimberlite deposits. Airborne and ground surveys, including magnetics, electromagnetics, and gravity surveys, are commonly employed to acquire geophysical data over large areas efficiently. Magnetic surveys detect variations in the Earth's magnetic field caused by magnetic minerals within kimberlites, which typically exhibit distinct magnetic signatures compared to surrounding rocks. Electromagnetic surveys measure variations in electrical conductivity, with conductive kimberlite bodies producing anomalous responses. Gravity surveys detect variations in gravitational attraction caused by differences in density between kimberlite and surrounding rocks. By analyzing and interpreting these geophysical anomalies, geologists can delineate potential kimberlite targets for further investigation, such as drilling. However, the interpretation of geophysical data requires careful consideration of geological context and potential masking effects from surrounding geology, highlighting the importance of integrating geophysical results with other exploration techniques for accurate targeting and successful diamond discoveries.

=== 3-D modeling ===
Three-dimensional (3D) modeling offers a comprehensive framework for understanding the internal structure and distribution of key geological features within potential diamond-bearing deposits. This process begins with the collection and integration of various datasets, including drill-hole data, ground geophysical surveys, and geological mapping information. These datasets are then integrated into a cohesive digital platform, often utilizing specialized software packages tailored for geological modeling. Through advanced visualization techniques, geologists can create detailed 3D representations of the subsurface geology, highlighting the distribution and geometry of kimberlite bodies alongside other significant geological features such as faults, fractures, and lithological boundaries. Within the model, efforts are made to accurately depict the internal phases of kimberlite pipes, incorporating different facies, country rock xenoliths, and mantle xenoliths identified through careful interpretation of drill-core data and geophysical surveys. Once validated, the 3D model serves as a valuable decision-making tool, offering insights into potential diamond-bearing potential, identifying high-priority drilling targets, and guiding exploration strategies to maximize the chances of successful diamond discoveries.

== Historical significance ==
Kimberlites are a valuable source of information about the composition of the Earth's mantle and the dynamic processes that occur within it. The study of kimberlites has contributed to our understanding of the Earth’s deep geochemical cycles and the mechanism of mantle plumes, which are upwellings of abnormally hot rock within the Earth's mantle.

Moreover, kimberlites are unique in their ability to transport material from the Earth's mantle to its surface. This process, known as xenolith transport, provides geologists with samples of the Earth's mantle, which are otherwise inaccessible. Analyzing these samples has led to significant advances in our knowledge of the Earth's deep interior, including its physical conditions, composition, and the evolutionary history of the planet.

The role of kimberlites in diamond exploration cannot be overstated. Diamonds are formed under the high-pressure, high-temperature conditions of the Earth's mantle. Kimberlites act as carriers for these diamonds, transporting them to the Earth's surface. The discovery of diamond-bearing kimberlites in the 1870s in Kimberley sparked a diamond rush, transforming the area into one of the world’s largest diamond-producing regions. Since then, the association between kimberlites and diamonds has been crucial in the search for new diamond deposits around the globe.

Kimberlites also serve as a window into the Earth's past, offering clues about the formation of continents and the dynamic processes that shape our planet. Their distribution and age can provide insights into ancient continental movements and the assembly and breakup of supercontinents.

== Economic importance ==
Kimberlites are the most important source of primary diamonds. Many kimberlite pipes also produce rich alluvial or eluvial diamond placer deposits. As of 2014 about 6,400 kimberlite pipes are known on Earth including about 900 that have been found to contain diamonds, with mining of diamonds occurring at about 30 pipes.

The discovery of diamond-rich kimberlite pipes in northern Canada during the early 1990s serves as a prime example of how challenging these deposits can be to locate, as their surface features are often subtle. In this case, the pipes were hidden beneath ice-covered shallow ponds, which filled depressions formed by the softer kimberlite rock eroding slightly faster than the surrounding harder rock.

The deposits occurring at Kimberley, South Africa, were the first recognized and the source of the name. The Kimberley diamonds were originally found in weathered kimberlite, which was colored yellow by limonite, and so was called "yellow ground". Deeper workings encountered less altered rock, serpentinized kimberlite, which miners call "blue ground". Yellow ground kimberlite is easy to break apart and was the first source of diamonds to be mined. Blue ground kimberlite needs to be run through rock crushers to extract the diamonds. The blue and yellow ground were both prolific producers of diamonds. After the yellow ground had been exhausted, miners in the late 19th century accidentally cut into the blue ground and found gem-quality diamonds in quantity. The economic situation at the time was such that, with a flood of diamonds being found, the miners undercut each other's prices and eventually decreased the diamonds' value down to cost in a short time.

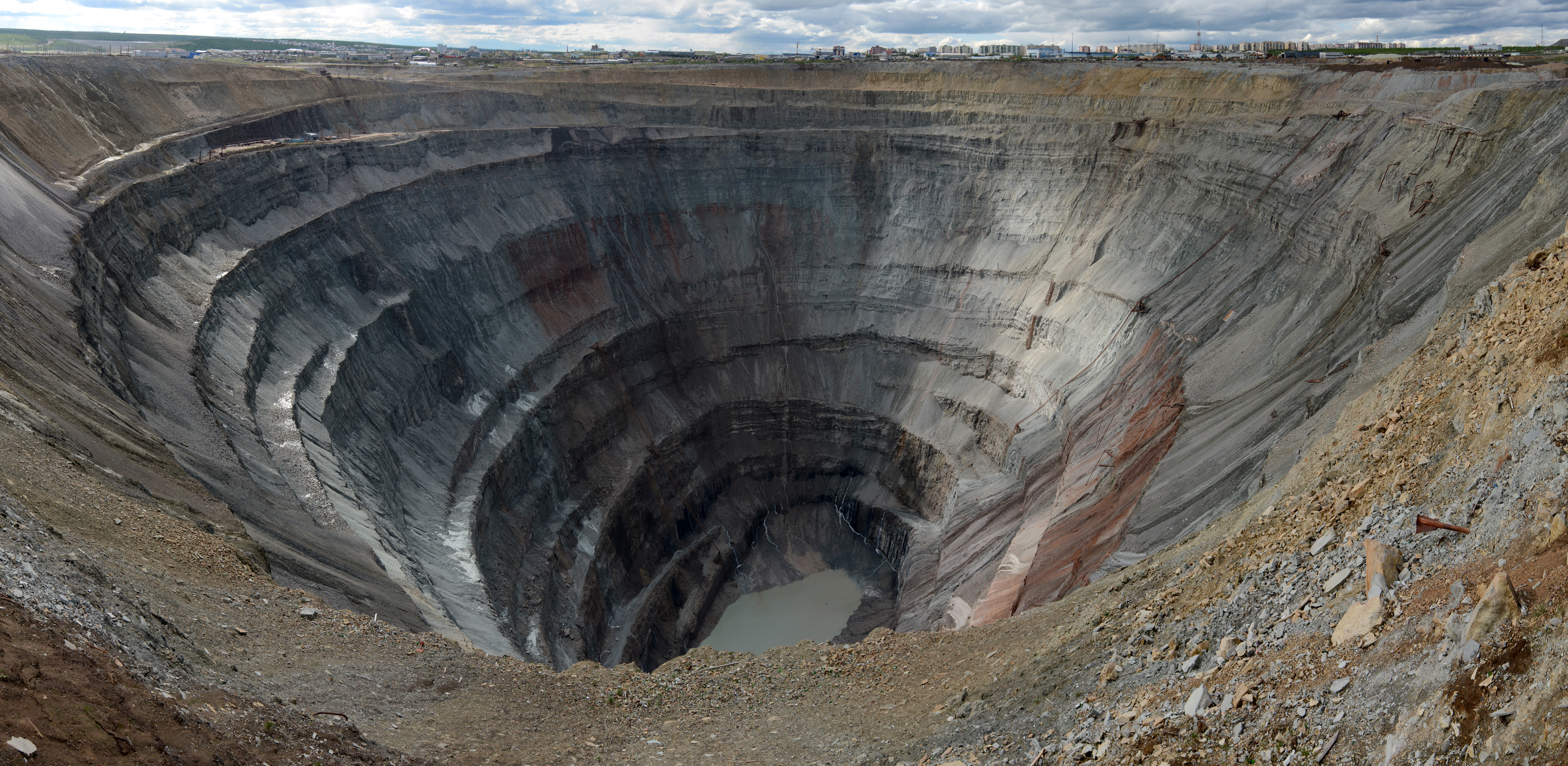
Mir mine

(See also: Mir Mine and Udachnaya pipe, both in the Sakha Republic, Russia).

== Related rock types ==
- Lamproite – Mantle rock expulsed to the surface in volcanic pipes
- Lamprophyre – Type of ultrapotassic igneous rock
- Nepheline syenite – Holocrystalline plutonic rock
- Ultrapotassic igneous rocks – Class of rare ultramafic or mafic igneous rocks rich in potassium
