= Ultrapotassic igneous rocks =

Class of rare ultramafic or mafic igneous rocks rich in potassium

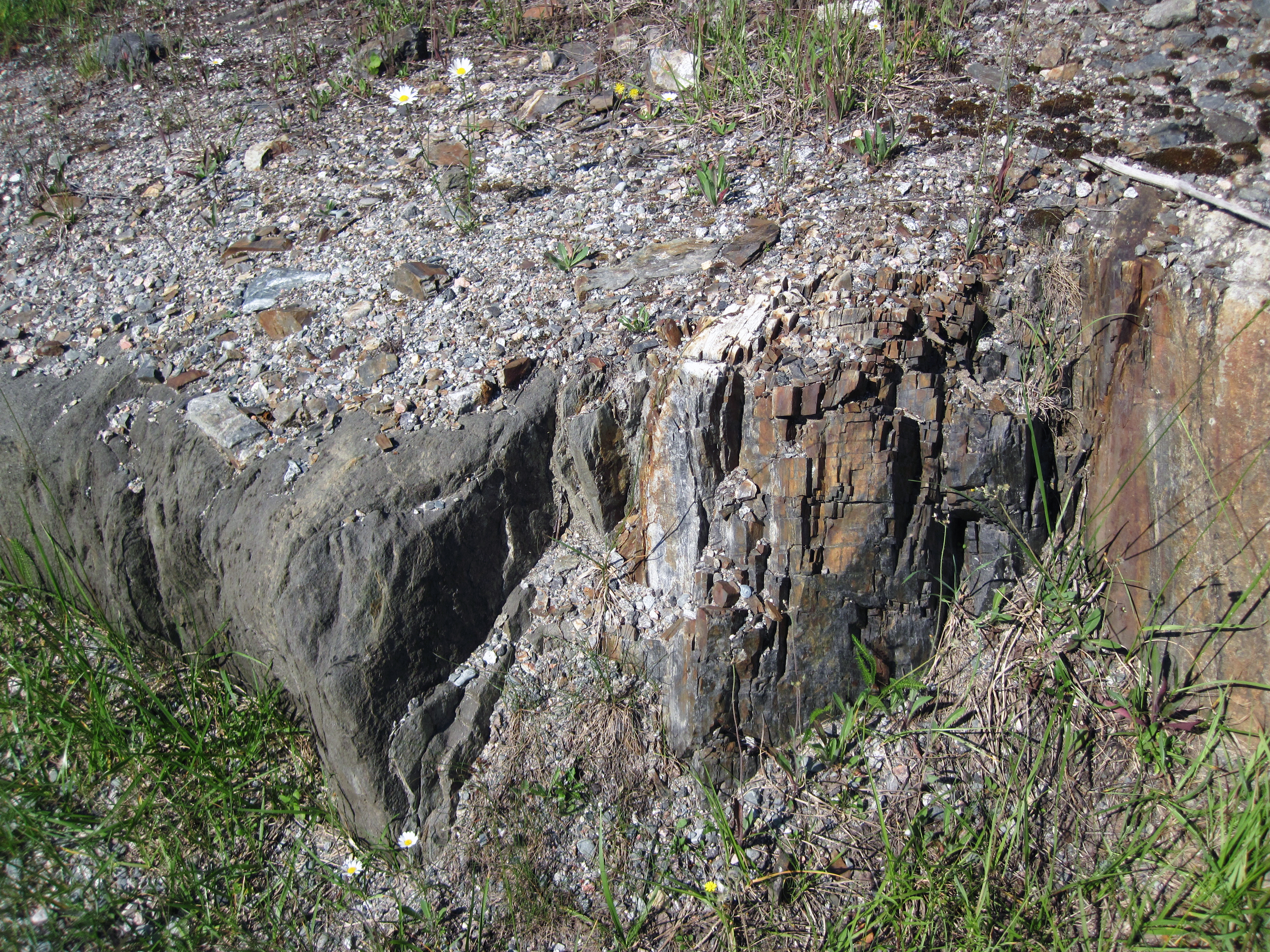
A dike composed of the ultrapotassic igneous rock, lamprophyre

Ultrapotassic igneous rocks are a class of rare, volumetrically minor, generally ultramafic or mafic silica-depleted igneous rocks.

While there are debates on the exact classifications of ultrapotassic rocks, they are defined by using the chemical screens K_{2}O/Na_{2}O > 3 in much of the scientific literature. However caution is indicated in interpreting the use of the term "ultrapotassic", and the nomenclature of these rocks continues to be debated, with some classifications using K_{2}O/Na_{2}O > 2 to indicate a rock is ultrapotassic.

== Conditions of formation ==
The magmas that produce ultrapotassic rocks are produced by a variety of mechanisms and from a variety of sources, but generally occur in a heterogenous, anomalous, phlogopite-bearing upper mantle.

The following conditions are favorable for the formation of ultrapotassic magmas.

- partial melting at a great depth
- low degrees of partial melting
- lithophile element (K, Ba, Cs, Rb) enrichment in sources
- enriched peridotite (variety harzburgite), especially in potassium
- pyroxene and phlogopite-rich volumes within the mantle, not from peridotite alone
- carbon dioxide or water (each condition leading to a distinctive magma);
- reaction of melts with surrounding rock as they rise from their sources

Mantle sources of ultrapotassic magmas may contain subducted sediments, or the sources may have been enriched in potassium by melts or fluids partly derived from subducted sediments. Phlogopite and/or potassic amphibole are typical in the sources from which many such magmas have been derived. Ultrapotassic granites are uncommon and may be produced by melting of the continental crust above upwelling mafic magma, such as at rift zones.

== Types of ultrapotassic rocks ==
- Lamprophyres and melilitic rocks
- Kimberlite
- Lamproite
- Orangeite (see Group II kimberlite)
- Feldspathoid-bearing rocks such as leucitites
- K-feldspar enriched leucogranites
- Vaugnerite and Durbachite

== Economic importance ==
The economic importance of ultrapotassic rocks is wide and varied. Because kimberlites, lamproites and lamprophyres are all produced at depths of 120 km or greater, they are known to be a major source of diamond deposits and thus can bring diamonds to the surface as xenocrysts. Additionally, ultrapotassic granites are a known host for granite-hosted gold mineralization and well as significant porphyry-style mineralization. Ultrapotassic A-type intracontinental granites may also be associated with fluorite and columbite – tantalite mineralization.
