= Diopside =

Pyroxene mineral

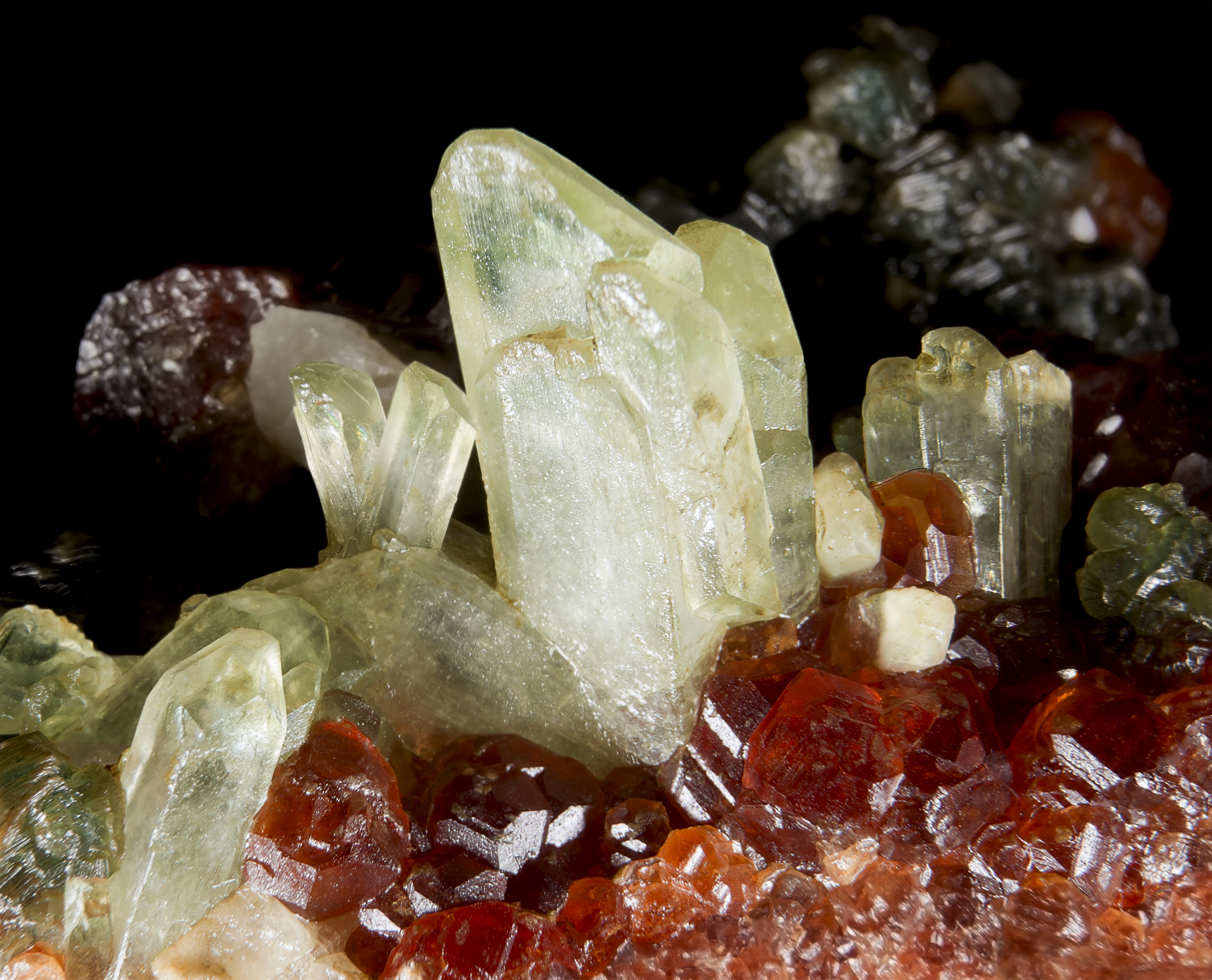
- Diopside – Bellecombe, Châtillon, Aosta Valley, Italy

General
- Category: Inosilicate minerals (single chain)
- Group: Pyroxene group, clinopyroxene subgroup
- Formula: MgCaSi_{2}O_{6}
- IMA symbol: Di
- Strunz classification: 9.DA.15
- Crystal system: Monoclinic
- Crystal class: Prismatic (2/m) (same H-M symbol)
- Space group: C2/c
- Unit cell: a = 9.746 Å, b = 8.899 Å c = 5.251 Å; β = 105.79°; Z = 4

Identification
- Color: Commonly light to dark green; may be blue, brown, colorless, white to snow white, grey, pale violet
- Crystal habit: Short prismatic crystals common, may be granular, columnar, massive
- Twinning: Simple and multiple twins common on {100} and {001}
- Cleavage: Distinct/good on {110}
- Fracture: Irregular/uneven, conchoidal
- Tenacity: Brittle
- Mohs scale hardness: 5.5–6.5
- Luster: Vitreous to dull
- Streak: white
- Specific gravity: 3.278
- Optical properties: Biaxial (+)
- Refractive index: n_{α}= 1.663 – 1.699, n_{β}= 1.671 – 1.705, n_{γ}= 1.693 – 1.728
- Birefringence: δ = 0.030
- 2V angle: Measured: 58° to 63°
- Dispersion: Weak to distinct, r>v
- Melting point: 1391 °C

Diopside is a monoclinic pyroxene mineral with composition MgCaSi_{2}O_{6}. It forms complete solid solution series with hedenbergite (FeCaSi_{2}O_{6}) and augite, and partial solid solutions with orthopyroxene and pigeonite. It forms variably colored, but typically dull green crystals in the monoclinic prismatic class. It has two distinct prismatic cleavages at 87 and 93° typical of the pyroxene series. It has a Mohs hardness of six, a Vickers hardness of 7.7 GPa at a load of 0.98 N, and a specific gravity of 3.25 to 3.55. It is transparent to translucent with indices of refraction of n_{α}=1.663–1.699, n_{β}=1.671–1.705, and n_{γ}=1.693–1.728. The optic angle is 58° to 63°.

== Formation ==
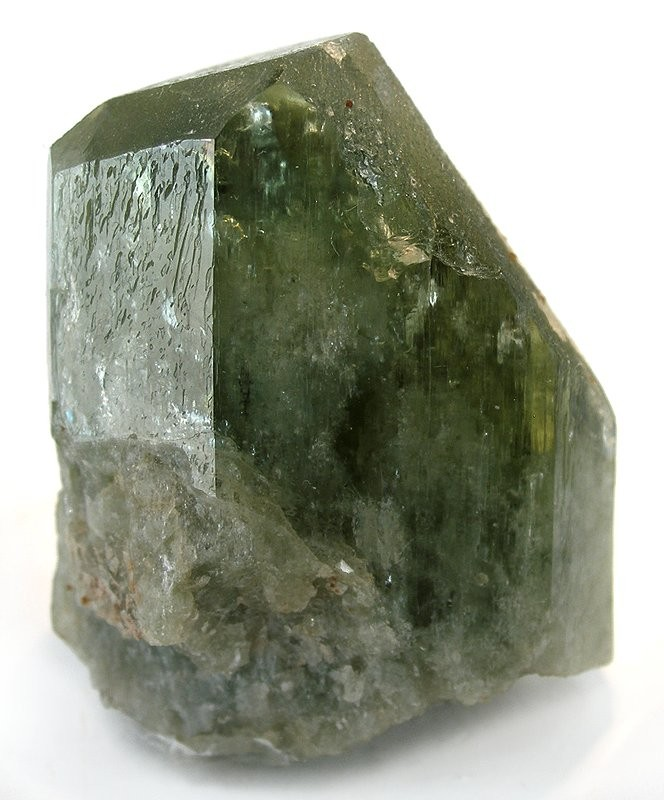
Diopside crystal from De Kalb, New York (size: 4.3 x 3.3 x 1.9 cm)

Diopside is found in ultramafic (kimberlite and peridotite) igneous rocks, and diopside-rich augite is common in mafic rocks, such as olivine basalt and andesite. Diopside is also found in a variety of metamorphic rocks, such as in contact metamorphosed skarns developed from high silica dolomites. It is an important mineral in the Earth's mantle and is common in peridotite xenoliths erupted in kimberlite and alkali basalt.

== Mineralogy and occurrence ==
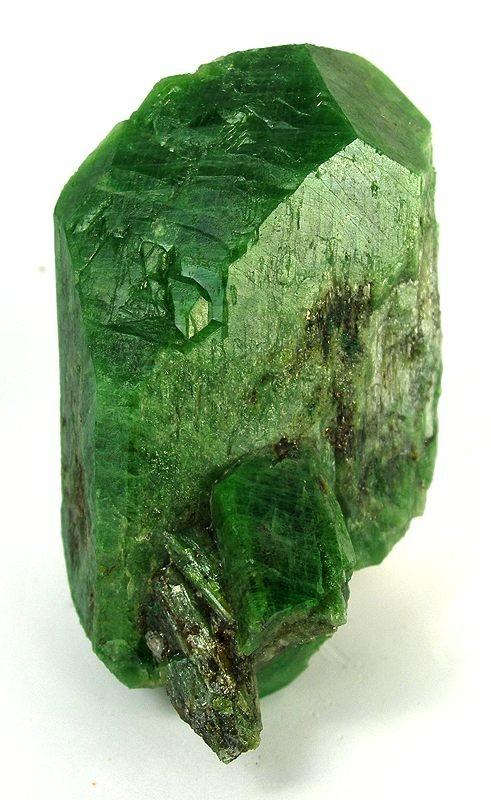
A green diopside found in Outokumpu, Finland

Diopside is a precursor of chrysotile (white asbestos) by hydrothermal alteration and magmatic differentiation; it can react with hydrous solutions of magnesium and chlorine to yield chrysotile by heating. Some vermiculite deposits, most notably those in Libby, Montana, are contaminated with chrysotile (as well as other forms of asbestos) that formed from diopside.

At relatively high temperatures, there is a miscibility gap between diopside and pigeonite, and at lower temperatures, between diopside and orthopyroxene. The calcium/(calcium+magnesium+iron) ratio in diopside that formed with one of these other two pyroxenes is particularly sensitive to temperature above 900 °C, and compositions of diopside in peridotite xenoliths have been important in reconstructions of temperatures in the Earth's mantle.

Chrome diopside (Ca(Mg,Cr)Si_{2}O_{6}) is a common constituent of peridotite xenoliths, and dispersed grains are found near kimberlite pipes, and as such are a prospecting indicator for diamonds. Occurrences are reported in Canada, South Africa, Russia, Brazil, and a wide variety of other locations. In the US, chromian diopside localities are described in the serpentinite belt in northern California, in kimberlite in the Colorado-Wyoming State Line district, in kimberlite in the Iron Mountain district, Wyoming, in lamprophyre at Cedar Mountain in Wyoming, and in numerous anthills and outcrops of the Tertiary Bishop Conglomerate in the Green River Basin of Wyoming. Much chromian diopside from the Green River Basin localities and several of the State Line Kimberlites have been gem in character.

== As a gem ==
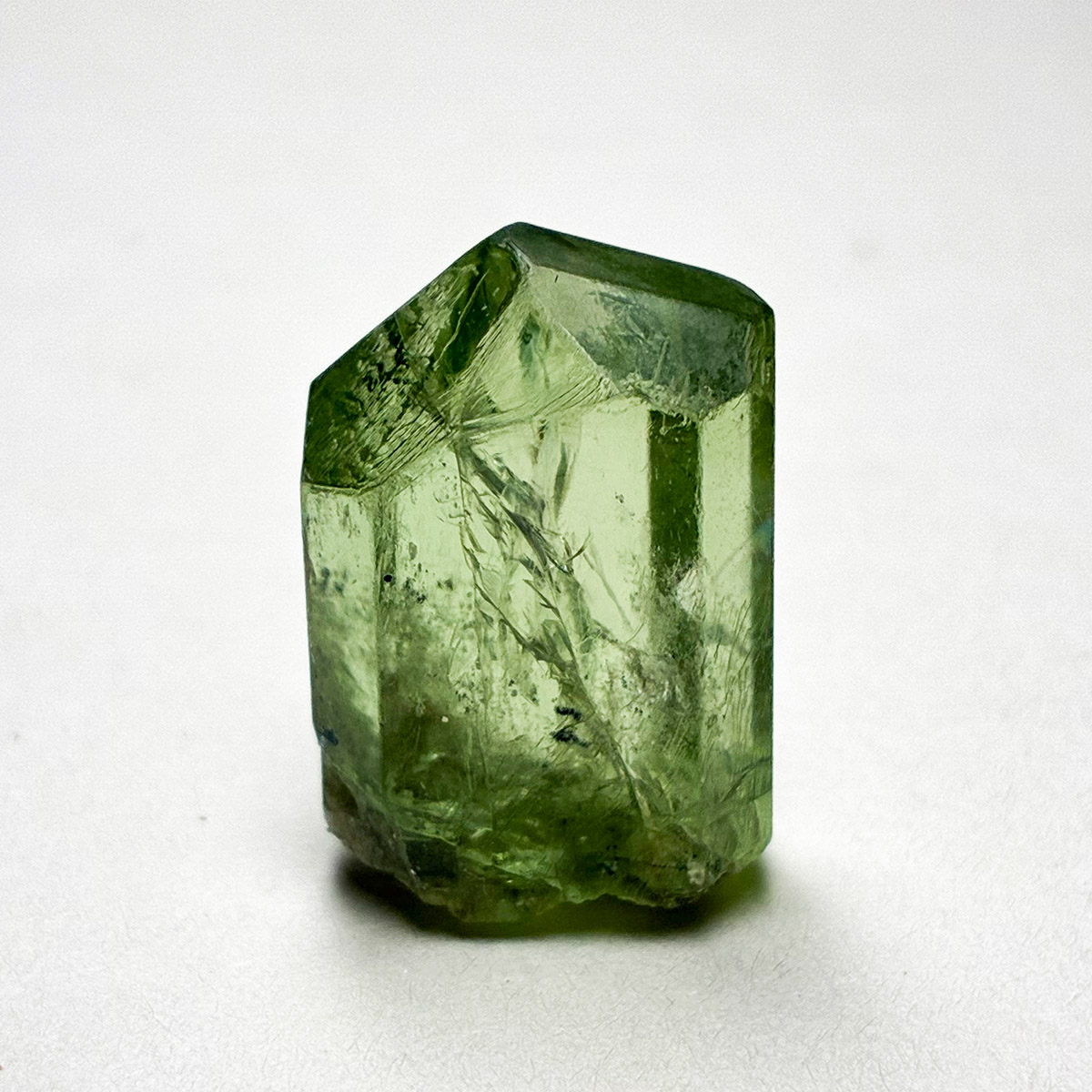
Gemstone-quality specimen from Xinjiang, China

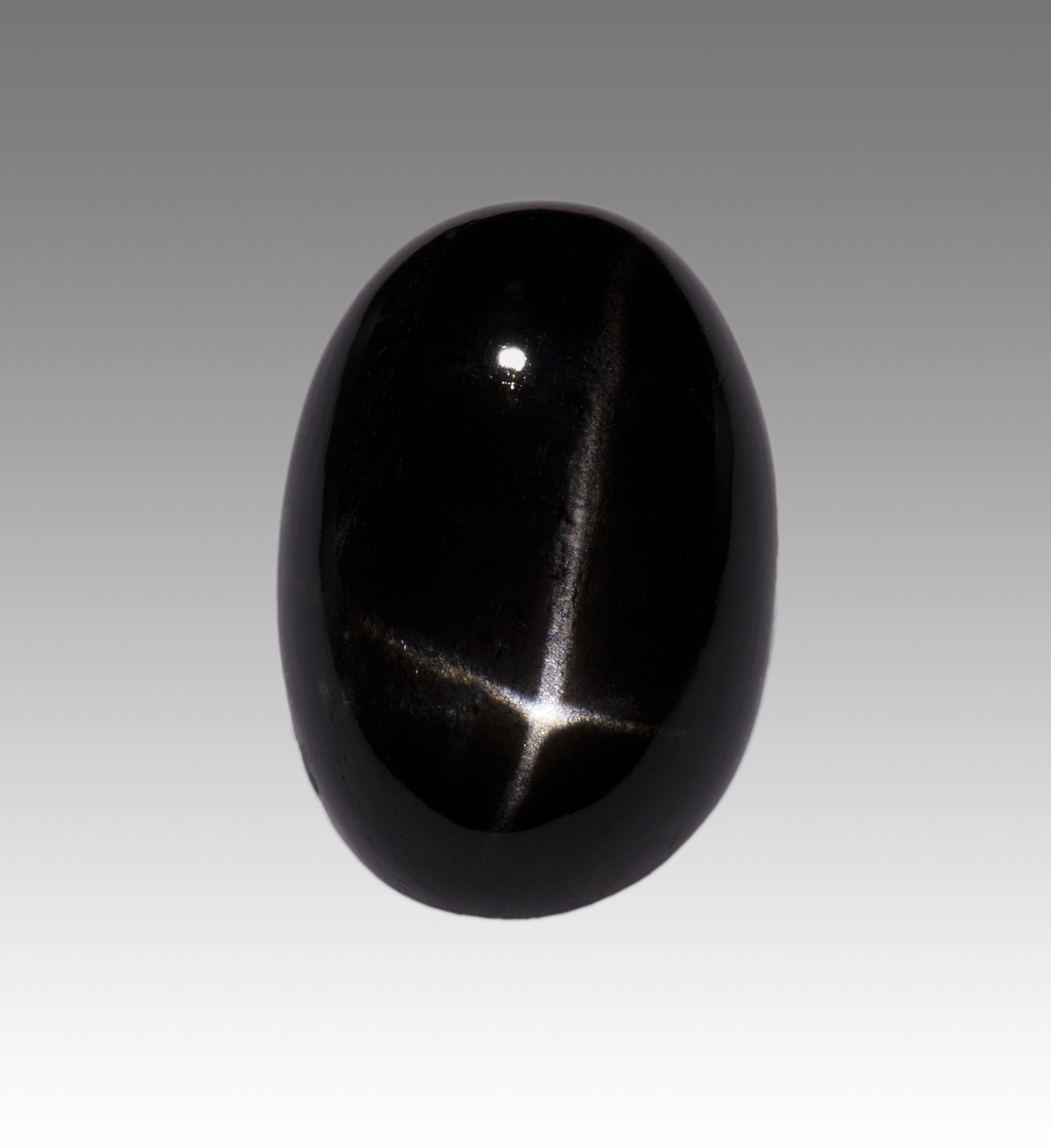
Black cabochon with light star from India

Gemstone quality diopside is found in two forms: black star diopside and chrome diopside (which includes chromium, giving it a rich green color). At 5.5–6.5 on the Mohs scale, chrome diopside is relatively soft to scratch. Due to the deep green color of the gem, they are sometimes referred to as Siberian emeralds, although they are on a gemological level completely unrelated, emerald being a precious stone and diopside being a semi-precious stone.

Green diopside crystals included within a white feldspar matrix are also sold as gemstones, usually as beads or cabochons. This stone is often marketed as 'green spot jasper' or green spot stone'.

Violane is a manganese-rich variety of diopside, violet to light blue in color.

== Etymology and history ==
Diopside derives its name from the Greek dis, "twice", and òpsè, "face" in reference to the two ways of orienting the vertical prism.

Diopside was discovered and first described about 1800, by Brazilian naturalist Jose Bonifacio de Andrada e Silva.

== Potential uses ==
Diopside based ceramics and glass-ceramics have potential applications in various technological areas. A diopside based glass-ceramic named 'silceram' was produced by scientists from Imperial College, UK during the 1980s from blast furnace slag and other waste products. They also produced glass-ceramic as a potential structural material. Similarly, diopside based ceramics and glass-ceramics have potential applications in the field of biomaterials, nuclear waste immobilization, and sealing materials in solid oxide fuel cells.

DIOPSIDE, VESUVIANITE (IN MARBLE) EGRI DERE, ARDINO, CENTRAL RHODOPES, BULGARIA, COLL. IVAN KOSTOV AT THE SOFIA UNIVERSITY "SAINT KLIMENT OHRIDSKI" MUSEUM OF MINERALOGY, PETROLOGY AND MINERAL RESOURCES
