= Subcontinental lithospheric mantle =

Earth cutaway from core to crust, the lithosphere comprising the crust and lithospheric mantle (detail not to scale)

The term "subcontinental lithosphere mantle" is an erroneous term [Stuwe, 2007]. The scientifically correct term is "continental lithospheric mantle" (CLM), which is the uppermost solid part of Earth's mantle associated with the continental mantle lithosphere, also known as continental lithospheric mantle that resides below the crust and above the asthenosphere. The term "subcontinental lithospheric mantle" is incorrect because it implies a continent does not include lithospheric mantle. However, continents are lithospheric, and the lithosphere includes both crust and mantle lithosphere.

The modern understanding of the Earth's upper mantle is that there are two distinct components - the lithospheric part and the asthenosphere. The lithosphere consists of crust and lithospheric mantle and behaves mostly in a plate-like fashion [Stuwe, 2007], whereas the asthenosphere is hotter and weaker due to the presence of partial melt and mantle convection. The boundary between these two layers is rheologically based and is not necessarily a strict function of depth. Specifically, oceanic lithosphere (lithosphere that comprises the oceanic tectonic plates) and continental lithosphere (lithosphere that comprises the continental tectonic plates) are defined as a thermomechanical boundary layer that conducts heat via conduction, and the sublithospheric mantle, including the asthenosphere, conducts heat by convection such that the sublithospheric mantle is convecting adiabatic. In contrast to oceanic lithosphere, which experiences quicker rates of recycling, continental lithosphere is chemically distinct, cold, and older. This difference is translated into the differences between the CLM and the oceanic lithospheric mantle.

There are two different types of continental lithospheric mantle that formed at different times in Earth's history: Archaean and Phanerozoic continental lithospheric mantle.

== Archaean continental lithospheric mantle ==
Archaean lithospheric mantle is strongly depleted in fertile melt indicators such as CaO and Al_{2}O_{3}. This depletion in major elements should then be a consequence of the Archaean lithosphere's formation. Trace-elements are abundant in the Archaean lithosphere relative to MORB (which samples the modern upper mantle) and have been sampled by Re-Os isotope dating of peridotites and ophiolites.

The trace element composition of these xenoliths suggests mixing between the two different layers of subcontinental mantle. Particularly, the theory for the removal of Archaean continental lithospheric mantle below Archaean continental crust via delamination helps to explain mantle-peridotite xenoliths found in the extinct Sierra Nevada arc. Though there is evidence for the preservation of the Archaean lithosphere, there is controversy over the preservation of the Archaean mantle, for which the Archaean lithosphere would have been derived.

The formation of the Archaean CLM is enigmatic. One early theory that komatiite melts formed the Archaean CLM does not explain how komatiites, which form in hot and deep environments, create a reservoir that is shallow and cool. Another model of Archaean CLM formation suggests that the CLM formed in a subduction environment in which new Archaean crust was created through slab melting.

If the primitive mantle is the starting composition for this CLM formation event, the subducting slab would be composed of TTG crust, then the removal of basaltic melt and the enrichment of the mantle wedge with felsic melts could explain the formation of the depleted Archaean subcontinental lithosphere. For more information, see Archaean subduction.

== Phanerozoic continental lithospheric mantle ==
The mechanism of arc subduction is well understood to be the location where new continental crust is formed and is presumably also the site of continental lithospheric mantle genesis. Firstly, hydrated oceanic crust slabs begin subducting, which releases fluids (subduction zone metamorphism) to the mantle wedge above. Continued subduction of the slab leads to further hydration of the mantle, which causes partial melting in the mantle wedge. It is expected then that the modern continental lithospheric mantle is a former, melt-depleted mantle wedge. If the connection between continental crust and the continental lithospheric mantle does not exist and rather a different Earth process formed both reservoirs, then it further complicates the mechanisms for how the Archaean subcontinental mantle formed.

== See also ==
- Continental lithosphere
- Lithospheric mantle
- Upper mantle
- Archean
- Phanerozoic
- Subduction
- Delamination (geology)
- Peridotite
- Xenolith
