= Ultramafic rock =

Type of igneous and meta-igneous rock

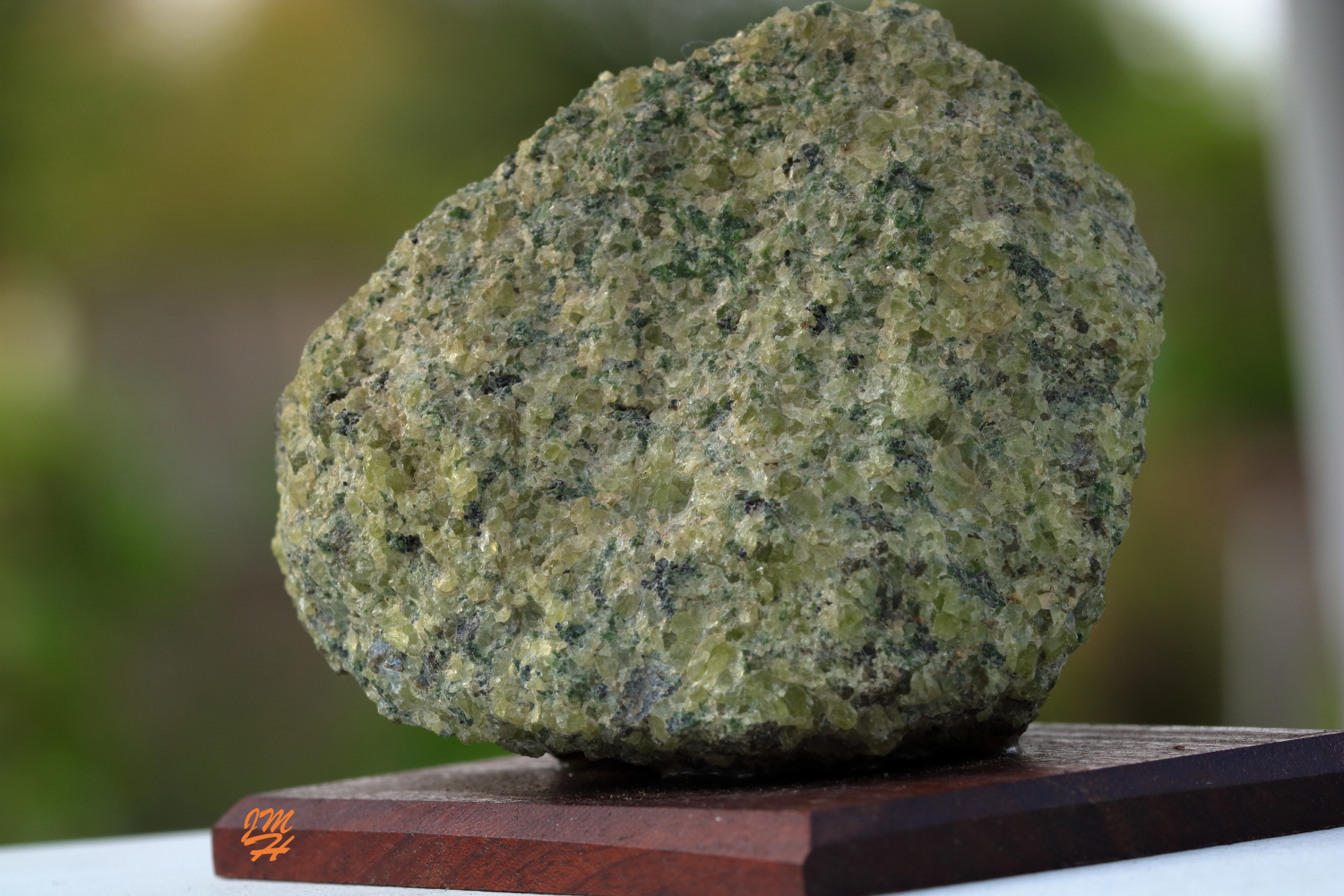
Peridotite, a type of ultramafic rock dominated by olivine

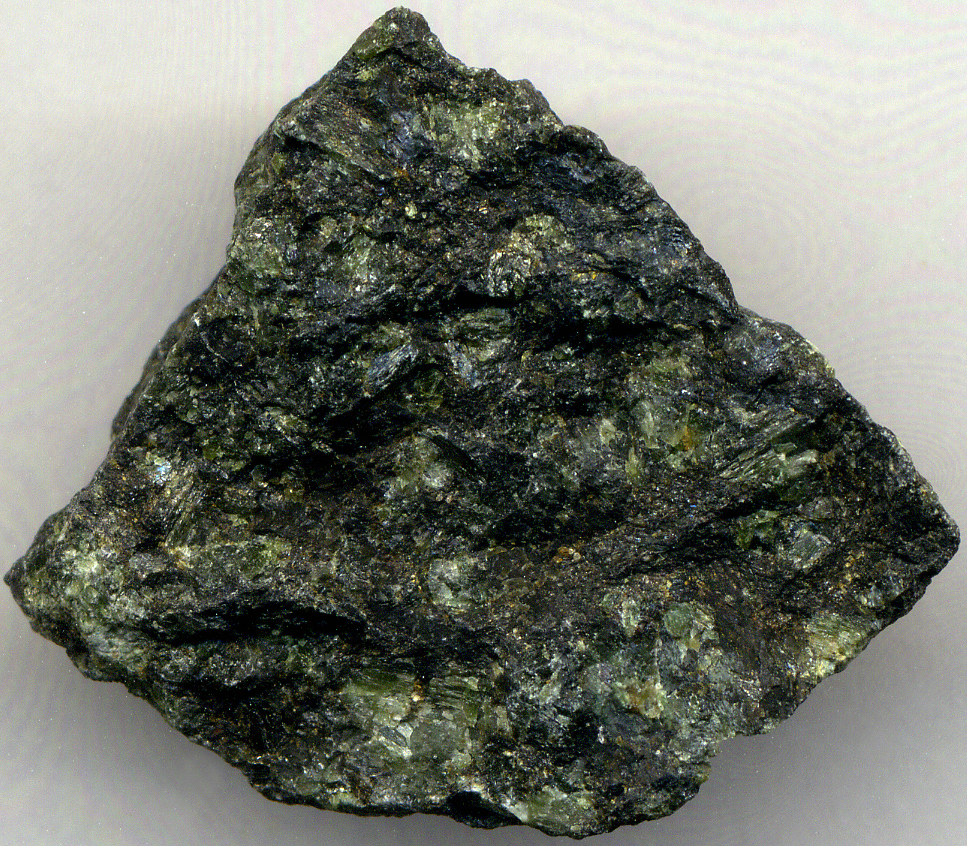
Pyroxenite, a type of ultramafic rock dominated by pyroxene minerals

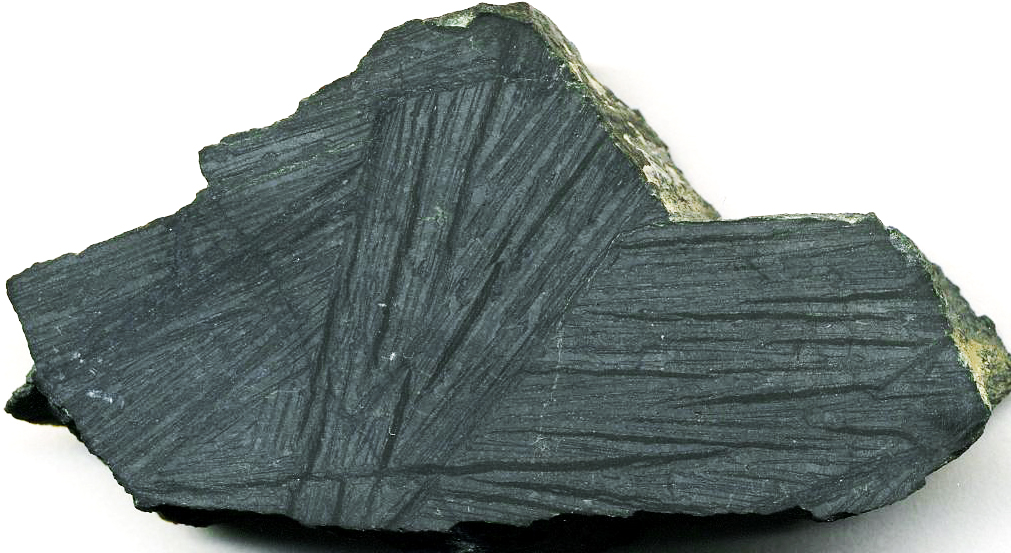
Archean komatiite from the Komati Formation in the Komati River Valley, South Africa, showcasing spinifex texture.

Ultramafic rocks (also referred to as ultrabasic rocks, although the terms are not wholly equivalent) are igneous and meta-igneous rocks with a very low silica content (less than 45%), generally >18% MgO, high FeO, low potassium, and are usually composed of greater than 90% mafic minerals (dark colored, high magnesium and iron content). Earth's mantle is composed of ultramafic rocks. Ultrabasic is a more inclusive term that includes igneous rocks with low silica content that may not be extremely enriched in Fe and Mg, such as carbonatites and ultrapotassic igneous rocks.

== Intrusive ultramafic rocks ==
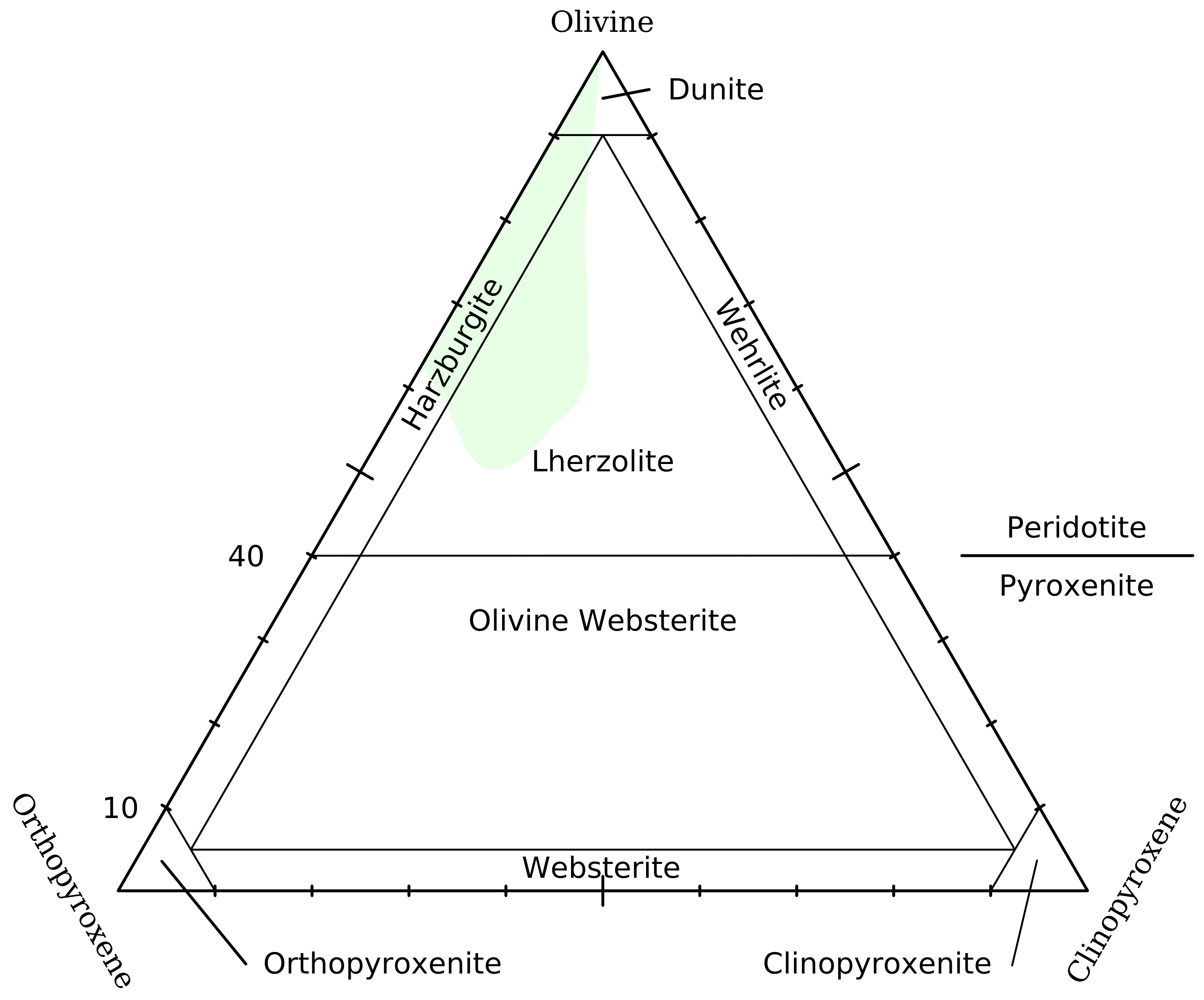
IUGS Classification diagram for intrusive ultramafic rocks based on modal percentages of mafic minerals. Green area represents typical mantle peridotite.

Intrusive ultramafic rocks are often found in large, layered ultramafic intrusions where differentiated rock types often occur in layers. Such cumulate rock types do not represent the chemistry of the magma from which they crystallized. The ultramafic intrusives include the dunites, peridotites and pyroxenites. Other rare varieties include troctolite which has a greater percentage of calcic plagioclase. These grade into the anorthosites. Gabbro and norite often occur in the upper portions of the layered ultramafic sequences. Hornblendite and, rarely phlogopite, are also found.

== Volcanic ultramafic rocks on Earth ==
Volcanic ultramafic rocks are rare outside of the Archaean and are essentially restricted to the Neoproterozoic or earlier. Subvolcanic ultramafic rocks and dykes persist longer, but are also rare. There is evidence of ultramafic rocks elsewhere in the Solar System.

Examples include komatiite and picritic basalt. Komatiites can be host to ore deposits of nickel.

=== Ultramafic tuff ===
Ultramafic tuff is extremely rare. It has a characteristic abundance of olivine or serpentine and a scarcity or absence of feldspar and quartz. Rare occurrences may include unusual surface deposits of maars of kimberlites in the diamond fields of southern Africa and other regions.

== Ultrapotassic ultramafic rocks ==
Technically ultrapotassic rocks and melilitic rocks are considered a separate group, based on melting model criteria, but there are ultrapotassic and highly silica-under-saturated rocks with >18% MgO which can be considered "ultramafic".

Ultrapotassic, ultramafic igneous rocks such as lamprophyre, lamproite and kimberlite are known to have reached the surface of the Earth. Although no modern eruptions have been observed, analogues are preserved.

Most of these rocks occur as dikes, diatremes, lopoliths or laccoliths, and very rarely, intrusions. Most kimberlite and lamproite occurrences occur as volcanic and subvolcanic diatremes and maars; lavas are virtually unknown.

Vents of Proterozoic lamproite (Argyle diamond mine), and Cenozoic lamproite (Gaussberg, Antarctica) are known, as are vents of Devonian lamprophyre (Scotland). Kimberlite pipes in Canada, Russia and South Africa have incompletely preserved tephra and agglomerate facies.

These are generally diatreme events and as such are not lava flows although tephra and ash deposits are partially preserved. These represent low-volume volatile melts and attain their ultramafic chemistry via a different process than typical ultramafic rocks.

== Metamorphic ultramafic rocks ==
Metamorphism of ultramafic rocks in the presence of water and/or carbon dioxide results in two main classes of metamorphic ultramafic rock; talc carbonate and serpentinite.

Talc carbonation reactions occur in ultramafic rocks at lower greenschist through to granulite facies metamorphism when the rock in question is subjected to metamorphism and the metamorphic fluid has more than 10% molar proportion of CO_{2} (carbon dioxide).

When such metamorphic fluids have less than 10% molar proportion of CO_{2}, reactions favor serpentinisation, resulting in chlorite-serpentine-amphibole type assemblages.

== Distribution in space and time ==
The majority of ultramafic rocks are exposed in orogenic belts, and predominate in Archaean and Proterozoic terranes. Ultramafic magmas in the Phanerozoic are rarer, and there are very few recognised true ultramafic lavas in the Phanerozoic.

Many surface exposures of ultramafic rocks occur in ophiolite complexes where deep mantle-derived rocks have been obducted onto continental crust along and above subduction zones.

== Soil, regolith, and biology ==
Serpentine soil is a magnesium rich, calcium, potassium and phosphorus poor soil that develops on the regolith derived from ultramafic rocks. Ultramafic rocks also contain elevated amounts of chromium and nickel which may be toxic to plants. As a result, a distinctive type of vegetation develops on these soils. Examples are the ultramafic woodlands and barrens of the Appalachian Mountains and piedmont, the "wet maquis" of the New Caledonia rain forests, and the ultramafic forests of Mount Kinabalu and other peaks in Sabah, Malaysia. Vegetation is typically stunted, and sometimes includes endemic species adapted to the soils.

Often thick, magnesite-calcrete caprock, laterite and duricrust forms over ultramafic rocks in tropical and subtropical environments. Particular floral assemblages associated with highly nickeliferous ultramafic rocks are indicative tools for mineral exploration.

Weathered ultramafic rocks may form lateritic nickel ore deposits.

Lichen communities on ultramafic rocks show distinctive characteristics, including the unusual co-presence of species that typically grow on either acidic or calcium-rich rocks, due to the rocks' unique chemical composition. While some lichen species appear to be characteristic of ultramafic environments within specific geographical regions, very few species are found exclusively on these rocks. Studies have shown that lichen communities on ultramafic rocks can be more diverse than those on adjacent mafic rocks, with some localities showing notably higher species counts on serpentinites compared to other rock types. These communities often display xerophytic characteristics and may include species with disjunct distribution patterns. The weathering action of lichens on ultramafic rocks can promote biogeochemical processes, including the complete depletion of magnesium from serpentine minerals beneath lichen thalli and the formation of secondary minerals common in serpentine soils.

== Other celestial bodies ==
=== Io ===
Ultramafic lava may have been detected on Io, a moon of Jupiter, because heat-mapping of Io's surface found ultra-hot areas with temperatures in excess of 1,200 °C (2,190 °F). The magma immediately below these hot spots is probably about 200 °C (360 °F) hotter, based on surface-to-subsurface temperature differences observed for lava on Earth. A temperature of 1,400 °C (2,550 °F) is thought to indicate the presence of ultramafic magma.

=== Mercury ===
Mercury appears to have ultramafic volcanic rock.

=== Mars ===
The undifferentiated crust of Mars is largely composed of mafic and ultramafic rocks. Dark lobate flows of upper Hesperian and early Amazonian age, probably extruded from a regional network of extension faults, can be traced in the Ladon Basin. Spectral analysis data confirm the ultramafic character of these flows and the underlying rocks.

=== Exoplanets ===
Mid-infrared (12.8 μm) observations have shown that the measured flux of TRAPPIST-1b (an exoplanet) is consistent with a surface model of ultramafic rocks.

== See also ==
- Chromitite
- Magnetite
- Kambalda type komatiitic nickel ore deposits
- Fractional crystallization (geology)
- Volcanism on Io, a moon of Jupiter
