= Lithospheric mantle =

Part of Earth's mantle

Earth cutaway from core to crust, the lithosphere comprising the crust and lithospheric mantle (detail not to scale)

The lithospheric mantle is the portion of the lithosphere within the mantle, as opposed to the crust. It is solid, and is the uppermost part of the mantle.

The lithospheric mantle is subdivided into the subcontinental lithospheric mantle (associated with the continental lithosphere) and oceanic lithospheric mantle (associated with the oceanic lithosphere).
