= Lamprophyre =

Type of ultrapotassic igneous rock

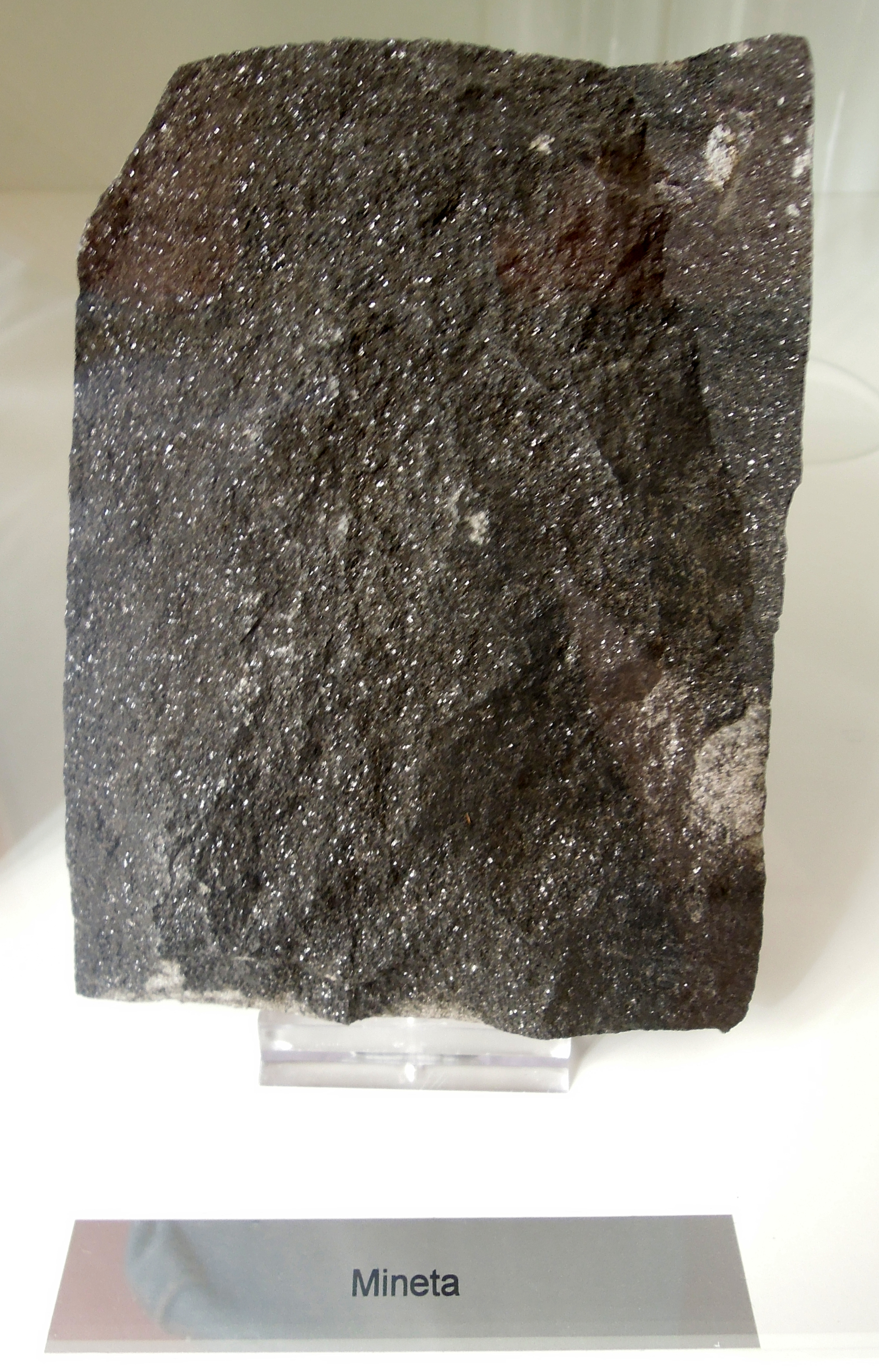
Minette (a type of lamprophyre), from Jáchymov in the Czech Republic

Lamprophyres (from Ancient Greek λαμπρός (lamprós) 'bright' and φύρω (phúrō) 'to mix') are uncommon, small-volume ultrapotassic igneous rocks primarily occurring as dikes, lopoliths, laccoliths, stocks, and small intrusions. They are alkaline silica-undersaturated mafic or ultramafic rocks with high magnesium oxide, >3% potassium oxide, high sodium oxide, and high nickel and chromium.

Lamprophyres occur throughout all geologic eras. Archaean examples are commonly associated with lode gold deposits. Cenozoic examples include magnesian rocks in Mexico and South America, and young ultramafic lamprophyres from Gympie in Australia with 18.5% MgO at ~250 Ma.

== Petrology ==
Modern science treats lamprophyres as a catch-all term for ultrapotassic mafic igneous rocks which have primary mineralogy consisting of amphibole or biotite, and with feldspar in the groundmass.

Lamprophyres are not amenable to classification according to modal proportions, such as the system QAPF, because of their peculiar mineralogy, nor compositional discrimination diagrams, such as TAS, because of their peculiar geochemistry. They are classified under the IUGS Nomenclature for Igneous Rocks (Le Maitre et al., 1989) separately; this is primarily because they are rare, have peculiar mineralogy and do not fit classical classification schemes. For example, the TAS scheme is inappropriate due to the control of mineralogy by potassium, not by calcium or sodium.

Mitchell has suggested that rocks belonging to the "lamprophyre facies" are characterized by the presence of phenocrysts of mica and/or amphibole together with lesser clinopyroxene and/or melilite set in a groundmass which may consist (either singly or in various combinations) of plagioclase, alkali feldspar, feldspathoids, carbonate, monticellite, melilite, mica, amphibole, pyroxene, perovskite, Fe-Ti oxides and glass.

Classification schemes which include genetic information may be required to properly describe lamprophyres (Tappe et al., 2005).

== Genesis ==
Rock considered lamprophyres to be part of a "clan" of rocks, with similar mineralogy, textures and genesis. Lamprophyres are similar to lamproites and kimberlites. While modern concepts see orangeites, lamproites and kimberlites as separate, a vast majority of lamprophyres have similar origins to these other rock types (Tappe et al., 2005).

Mitchell considered the lamprophyres as a "facies" of igneous rocks created by a set of conditions (generally; late, highly volatile differentiates of other rock types). Either scheme may apply to some, but not all, occurrences and variations of the broader group of rocks known as lamprophyres and melilitic rocks.

Leaving aside complex petrogenetic arguments, the essential components in lamprophyre genesis are:

- high depth of melting, which yields more mafic magmas;
- low degrees of partial melting, which yields magmas rich in the alkalis (particularly potassium);
- lithophile element (K, Ba, Cs, Rb) enrichment, high Ni and Cr,
- high potassium and sodium concentrations (silica undersaturation is common)
- some form of volatile enrichment, to provide the biotite (phlogopite) and amphibole (pargasite) mineralogy
- lack of fractional crystallisation (generally; there are exceptions)
- high Mg# (MgO/(FeO + MgO))

Individual examples thus may have a wide variety of mineralogy and mechanisms for formation. Rock considered lamprophyres to be derived from deep, volatile-driven melting in a subduction zone setting. Others such as Mitchell consider them to be late offshoots of plutons, etc., though this can be difficult to reconcile with their primitive melt chemistry and mineralogy.

== Petrography ==
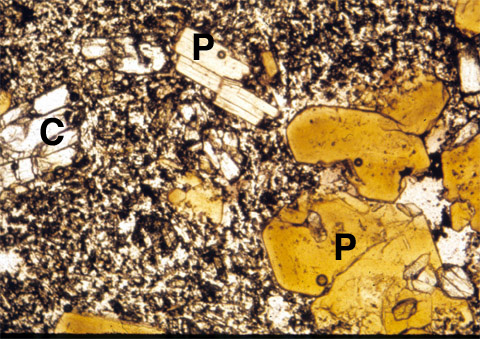
Microscope view (long dimension 2 mm) of a thin section of minette from the Colorado Plateau. Magnesium-rich biotite (P, phlogopite) and clinopyroxene (C) phenocrysts in a groundmass of alkali feldspar, pyroxene, and iron-titanium oxides.

Lamprophyres are a group of rocks containing phenocrysts, usually of biotite and amphibole (with bright cleavage surfaces), and pyroxene, but not of feldspar. They are thus distinguished from the porphyries and porphyrites in which the feldspar has crystallized in two generations. They are essentially dike rocks, occurring as dikes and thin sills, and are also found as marginal facies of plutonic intrusions. They are usually dark in color, owing to the abundance of ferro-magnesian silicates, of high specific gravity and liable to decomposition. For these reasons they have been defined as a melanocrate series (rich in the dark minerals); and they are often accompanied by a complementary leucocrate series (rich in the white minerals feldspar and quartz) such as aplites, porphyries and felsites.

Biotite (usually phlogopite) and amphibole (usually pargasite or other magnesian hornblende) are panidiomorphic; all are euhedral, well formed. Feldspar is restricted to the ground mass. In many lamprophyres the pale quartz and felspathic ingredients tend to occur in rounded spots, or ocelli, in which there has been progressive crystallization from the margins towards the center. These spots may consist of radiate or brush-like feldspars (with some phlogopite and hornblende) or of quartz and feldspar. A central area of quartz or of analcite probably represents an original miarolitic cavity infilled at a later period.

The presence or absence of the four dominant minerals, orthoclase, plagioclase, biotite and hornblende, determines the species:

- Minette contains biotite and orthoclase.
- Kersantite contains biotite and plagioclase.
- Vogesite contains hornblende and orthoclase.
- Spessartite contains hornblende and plagioclase.
- Monchiquite contains no feldspar, has a glassy or feldspathoid-bearing groundmass, and contains amphibole phenocrysts.

Each variety of lamprophyre may and often does contain all four minerals but is named according to the two which predominate.

These rocks contain also iron oxides (usually titaniferous), apatite, sometimes sphene, augite, and olivine. The hornblende and biotite are brown or greenish-brown, and as a rule their crystals even when small are very perfect and give the thin section views an easily recognizable character. Green hornblende occurs in some of these rocks. Augite exists as euhedral crystals of pale green color, often zonal and readily weathering. Olivine in the fresh state is rare; it forms rounded, corroded grains; in many cases it is decomposed to green or colorless hornblende in radiating nests (pilite). The plagioclase occurs as small rectangular crystals; orthoclase may have similar shapes or may be fibrous and grouped in sheaf-like aggregates that are narrow in the middle and spread out towards both ends. As all lamprophyres are prone to alteration by weathering a great abundance of secondary minerals is usually found in them; the principal are calcite and other carbonates, limonite, chlorite, quartz and kaolin.

Ocellar structure is common; the ocelli consist mainly of orthoclase and quartz, and may be up to one quarter of an inch in diameter. Another feature of these rocks is the presence of large foreign crystals, or xenocrysts, of feldspar and of quartz. Their forms are rounded, indicating partial resorption and the quartz may be surrounded by corrosion borders of minerals such as augite and hornblende produced where the magma is attacking the crystal.

Lamprophyres (including minette) traditionally have been defined as:

- normally occurring as porphyritic dikes
- containing matrix restricted feldspars and/or feldspathoids if present
- biotite or phlogopite is an essential mineral phase
- commonly extensively hydrothermally altered
- may contain primary calcite, zeolites and other more typically hydrothermal minerals
- higher than normal contents of K_{2}O and/or Na_{2}O, H_{2}O, CO_{2}, S, P_{2}O_{5}, and Ba

On a purely chemical basis, an extrusive lamprophyre (sp. minette) might be classified as potassic trachybasalt, shoshonite, or latite using the total alkali-silica diagram (see TAS classification), or as absarokite, shoshonite, or banakite using a classification sometimes applied to potassium-rich lavas. Such chemical classifications ignore the distinctive textures and mineralogies of lamprophyres.

== Nomenclature ==
The naming and classification of lamprophyres has had several revisions, and much argument within the geological community. Nicholas Rock and colleagues devoted much time to a complicated descriptive system of nomenclature which took after a series of nomenclature based on regional examples of the very diverse mineralogical expression of lamprophyres. This system was based on a somewhat provincial, rustic system of naming after French villages nearby were found the first described examples of various species of lamprophyre (Vosges being the prime example).

Modern nomenclature has been derived from an attempt to constrain some genetic parameters of lamprophyre genesis. This has, by and large, dispensed with the previous provincial names of lamprophyre species, in favor of a mineralogical name. The old names are still used for convenience.

=== Vogesite ===
Vogesite was first described from the Vosges mountains, France, where rocks of this type (actually, minette) were described in the early 20th century.

=== Minette ===
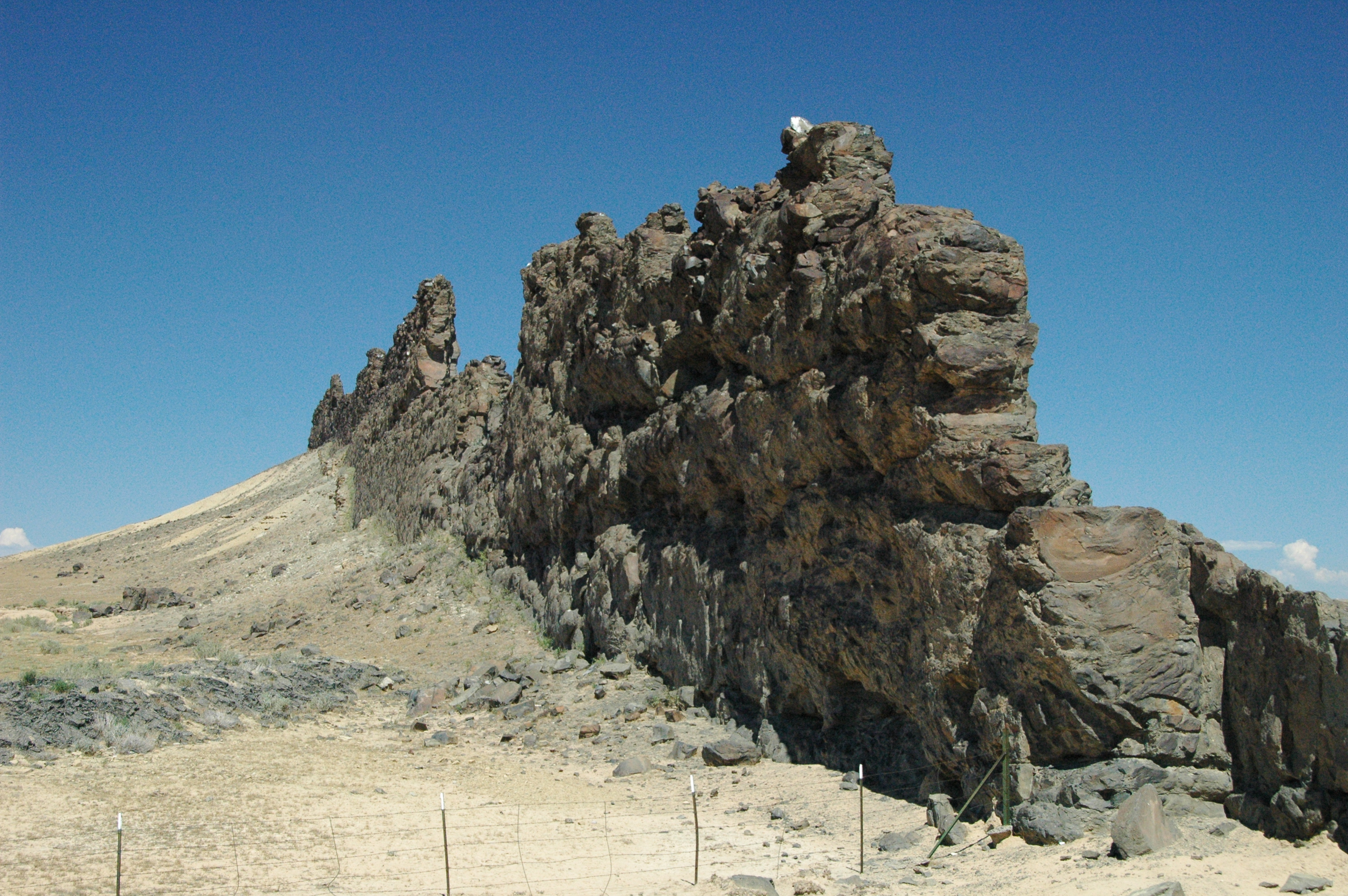
A dike of minette near Shiprock, Navajo Volcanic Field

A historical view of minette was provided by Johannsen (1937). He wrote that the name was " ... used by the miners in the Vosges apparently for oolitic or granular iron ore, and possibly derived from the valley of Minkette, where it occurs...."

Examples include minettes in the Navajo Volcanic Field (e.g. dikes near Shiprock and Mitten Rock, NM) of the Colorado Plateau and in the Mexican Volcanic Belt.

=== Kersantite ===
Kersantite is named after the village of Kersanton, Brittany, France, where the rock was first identified. An obsolete name for kersantite is kersanton.

== Distribution ==
Lamprophyres are usually associated with voluminous granodiorite intrusive episodes. They occur as marginal facies to some granites, though usually as dikes and sills marginal to and crosscutting the granites and diorites. In other districts where granites are abundant no rocks of this class are known. It is rare to find only one member of the group present, but minettes, vogesites, kersantites, etc., all appear and there are usually transitional forms.

Lamprophyres are also known to be spatially and temporally associated with gold mineralisation, for example orogenic gold deposits. Rock (1991) considered lamprophyres to be possible source rocks for the gold, but this view is not generally supported. The more reasonable explanation for the correlation is that lamprophyres, representing "wet" melts of the asthenosphere and mantle, correlate with a period of high fluid flow from the mantle through the crust, during subduction-related metamorphism, which drives gold mineralisation.

Non-melilitic lamprophyres are found in many districts where granites and diorites occur, such as the Scottish Highlands and Southern Uplands of Scotland; the Lake District of northwest England; Ireland; the Vosges Mountains of France; the Black Forest and Harz mountain regions of Germany; Mascota, Mexico; Jamaica and in certain locations of British Columbia, Canada.
