= Aggregate (geology) =

Geological mass

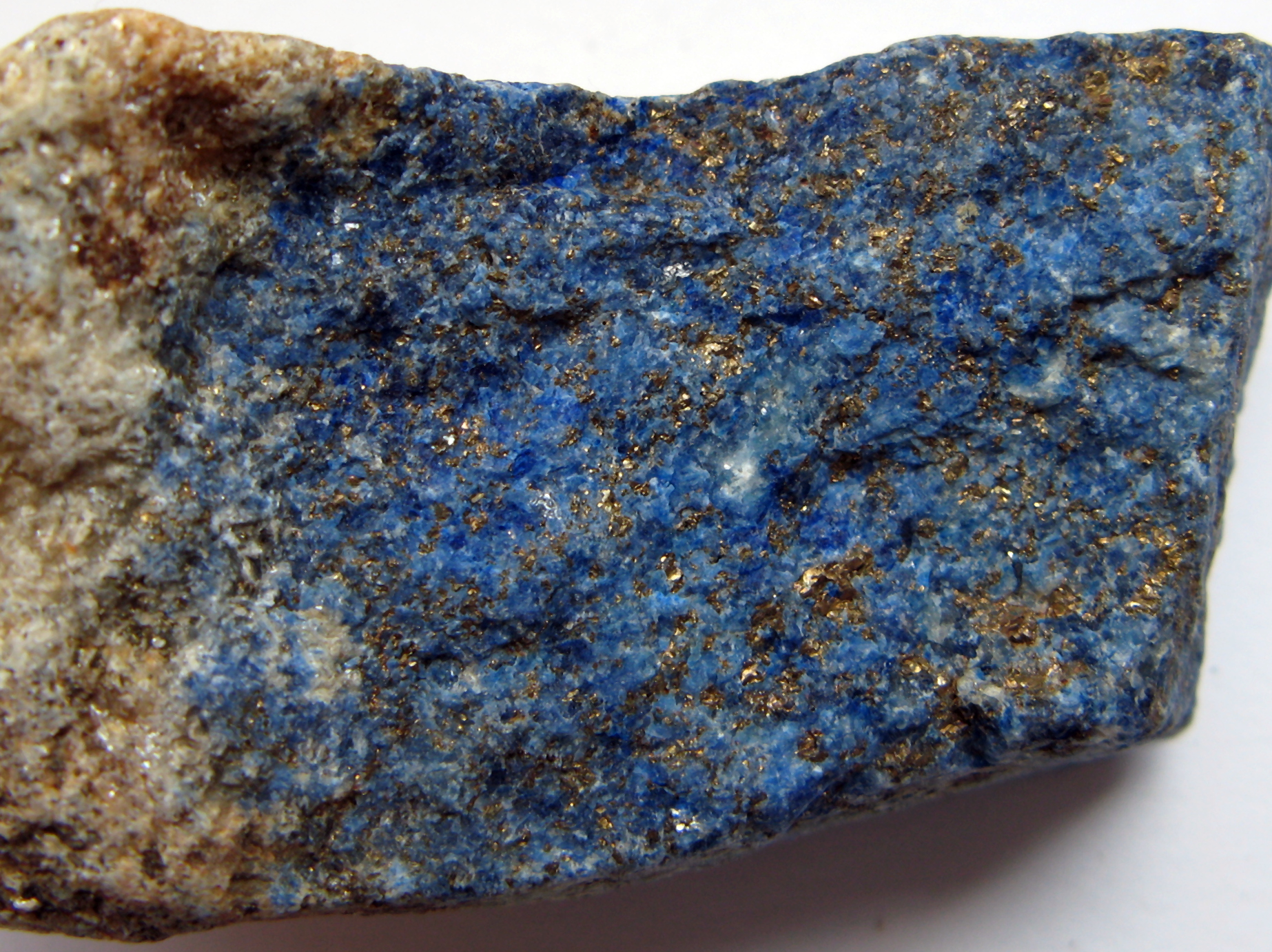
Crystal aggregate (lapis lazuli from Afghanistan)

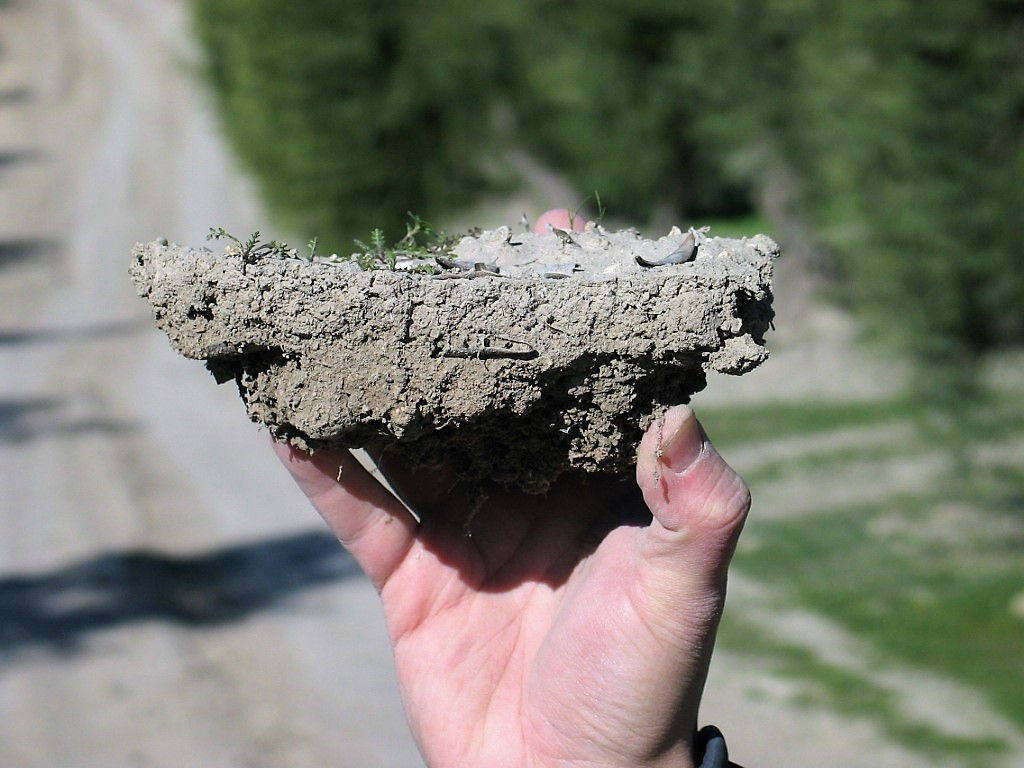
Soil aggregate in Spain

In the Earth sciences, aggregate has two possible meanings.

In mineralogy and petrology, an aggregate is a mass of mineral crystals, mineraloid particles or rock particles. Examples are dolomite, which is an aggregate of crystals of the mineral dolomite, and rock gypsum, which is an aggregate of crystals of the mineral gypsum. Lapis lazuli, for another example, is a type of rock composed of an aggregate of crystals of many minerals including lazurite, pyrite, phlogopite, calcite, potassium feldspar, wollastonite and some sodalite group minerals.

In pedology, an aggregate is a mass of soil particles. If it has formed naturally, it can be called a ped; if formed artificially, it can be called a clod.

== See also ==
- Interfacial Transition Zone (ITZ)
- Soil structure
