= List of rock types =

The following is a list of rock types recognized by geologists. There is no agreed number of specific types of rock. Any unique combination of chemical composition, mineralogy, grain size, texture, or other distinguishing characteristics can describe a rock type. Additionally, different classification systems exist for each major type of rock. There are three major types of rock: igneous rock, metamorphic rock, and sedimentary rock.

== Igneous rocks ==
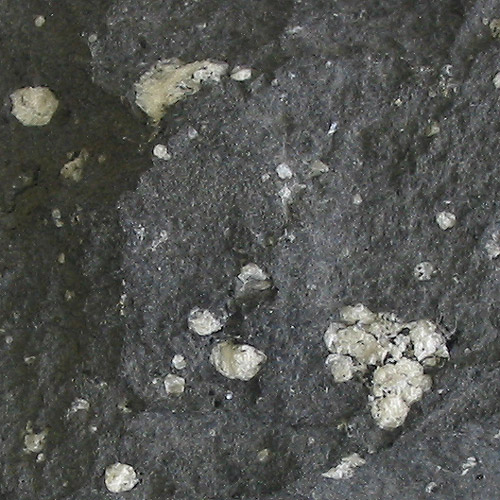
A sample of andesite (dark groundmass) with amygdaloidal vesicles filled with zeolite. Diameter of view is 8 cm.

- Adakite – Volcanic rock type
- Agpaitic rock – Peralkaline igneous rock
- Andesite – Type of volcanic rock
- Alkali feldspar granite – Type of igneous rock rich in alkali feldspar
- Ankaramite – Type of volcanic rock - Igneous rock belonging to basalt family
- Anorthosite – Mafic intrusive igneous rock composed predominantly of plagioclase
- Aplite – Fine-grained intrusive igneous rock type similar to granite
- Basalt – Magnesium- and iron-rich extrusive igneous rock
  - ʻAʻā – Molten rock expelled by a volcano during an eruption – Basaltic lava with a crumpled appearance
  - Pāhoehoe – Molten rock expelled by a volcano during an eruption – Basaltic lava with a flowing, often ropy appearance
- Basaltic andesite – Volcanic rock that is intermediate in composition between basalt and andesite
- Basaltic trachyandesite – Naming system for volcanic rocks
  - Mugearite – Volcanic rock type
  - Shoshonite – Potassium-rich variety of basaltic trachyandesite
- Basanite – Type of volcanic rock
- Blairmorite – Rare porphyritic volcanic rock
- Boninite – Ultramafic extrusive rock high in both magnesium and silica
- Carbonatite – Igneous rock with more than 50% carbonate minerals
- Charnockite – Type of granite containing orthopyroxene
  - Enderbite – Igneous rock of the charnockite series
- Dacite – Volcanic rock intermediate in composition between andesite and rhyolite
- Diabase, also known as dolerite – Type of igneous rock
- Diorite – Igneous rock type
  - Napoleonite, also known as corsite – Variety of diorite with orbicular structure
- Dunite – Type of peridotite with at least over 90% olivine
- Essexite – Igneous rock type
- Foidolite – Igneous rock rich in feldspathoid minerals
- Gabbro – Coarse-grained mafic intrusive rock
- Granite – Type of igneous rock
- Granodiorite – Type of coarse grained intrusive igneous rock
- Granophyre – Type of subvolcanic rock
- Harzburgite – Type of peridotite with less than 5% clinopyroxene and less than 90% olivine.
- Hornblendite – Plutonic rock consisting mainly of the amphibole hornblende
- Hyaloclastite – Volcanic rock consisting of glass fragments
- Icelandite – Igneous rock type
- Ignimbrite – Type of volcanic rock
- Ijolite – Igneous rock consisting essentially of nepheline and augite
- Kimberlite – Igneous rock which sometimes contains diamonds
- Komatiite – Magnesium-rich igneous rock
- Lamproite – Mantle rock expulsed to the surface in volcanic pipes
- Lamprophyre – Type of ultrapotassic igneous rock – An ultramafic, ultrapotassic intrusive rock dominated by mafic phenocrysts in a feldspar groundmass
- Latite – Type of volcanic rock – A silica-undersaturated form of andesite
- Leucitite
- Lherzolite – Type of igneous rock – An ultramafic rock, essentially a peridotite
- Monzodiorite An intrusive igneous rock intermediate in composition between diorite and monzonite
- Monzogabbro – Type of intrusive igneous rock
- Monzogranite – Biotite granite rocks that are considered to be the final fractionation product of magma – A silica-undersaturated granite with <5% normative quartz
- Monzonite – Igneous intrusive rock with low quartz and equal plagioclase and alkali feldspar – a plutonic rock with <5% normative quartz
- Nepheline-bearing diorite – Form of intrusive igneous rock
- Nepheline syenite – Holocrystalline plutonic rock – A silica-undersaturated plutonic rock of nepheline and alkali feldspar
- Nephelinite – Igneous rock made up almost entirely of nepheline and clinopyroxene – A silica-undersaturated plutonic rock with >90% nepheline
- Norite – Mafic intrusive igneous rock – A hypersthene-bearing gabbro
- Obsidian – Naturally occurring volcanic glass
- Pegmatite – Igneous rock with very large interlocked crystals
- Peridotite – Coarse-grained ultramafic igneous rock
- Phonolite – Uncommon extrusive rock – A silica-undersaturated volcanic rock; essentially similar to nepheline syenite
- Phonotephrite – A volcanic rock with a composition between phonolite and tephrite
- Picrite – Variety of high-magnesium basalt that is very rich in the mineral olivine – An olivine-bearing basalt
- Porphyry – Textural form of igneous rock with large grained crystals in a fine matrix
- Pumice – Volcanic rock
- Pyroxenite – Ultramafic igneous rock composed of pyroxene minerals - a coarse grained plutonic rock composed of >90% pyroxene
- Quartz diorite – Igneous, plutonic rock – A diorite with >5% modal quartz
- Quartz monzonite – Type of igneous rock – An intermediate plutonic rock, essentially a monzonite with 5–10% modal quartz
- Quartzolite – Extremely rare igneous rock made mostly of quartz – An intrusive rock composed mostly of quartz
- Rhyodacite – Volcanic rock rich in silica and low in alkali metal oxides – A felsic volcanic rock which is intermediate between a rhyolite and a dacite
- Rhyolite – Igneous, volcanic rock, of felsic (silica-rich) composition
  - Comendite – Hard, peralkaline igneous rock, a type of light blue grey rhyolite
  - Pantellerite – Peralkaline rhyolite type of volcanic rock
- Scoria – Dark vesicular volcanic rock
- Shonkinite – Intrusive igneous rock – a plutonic rock
- Sovite – Igneous rock – A coarse-grained carbonatite rock
- Syenite – Intrusive igneous rock – A plutonic rock dominated by orthoclase feldspar; a type of granitoid
- Syenogranite – Intrusive igneous rock of the granite family
- Tachylyte – Form of basaltic volcanic glass – Essentially a basaltic glass
- Tephriphonolite – Type of igneous rock – A volcanic rock with a composition between phonotephrite and phonolite
- Tephrite – Igneous, volcanic rock – A silica-undersaturated volcanic rock
- Tonalite – Igneous rock – A plagioclase-dominant granitoid
- Trachyandesite – Extrusive igneous rock – An alkaline intermediate volcanic rock
  - Benmoreite – Volcanic rock type - sodic trachyandesite
- Trachybasalt – Volcanic rock – A volcanic rock with a composition between basalt and trachyte
  - Hawaiite – Volcanic rock – a sodic type of trachybasalt, typically formed by ocean island (hot spot) volcanism
- Trachyte – Extrusive igneous rock – A silica-undersaturated volcanic rock; essentially a feldspathoid-bearing rhyolite
- Troctolite – Igneous rock – A plutonic ultramafic rock containing olivine, pyroxene and plagioclase
- Trondhjemite – Light-colored intrusive igneous rock – A form of tonalite where plagioclase-group feldspar is oligoclase
- Tuff – Rock consolidated from volcanic ash
- Vitrophyre – Glassy volcanic rock - Glassy igneous rock with phenocrysts
- Websterite – Pyroxenite with clino and orthopyroxene – A type of pyroxenite, composed of clinopyroxene and orthopyroxene
- Wehrlite – Ultramafic rock - An ultramafic plutonic or cumulate rock, a type of peridotite, composed of olivine and clinopyroxene

== Sedimentary rocks ==
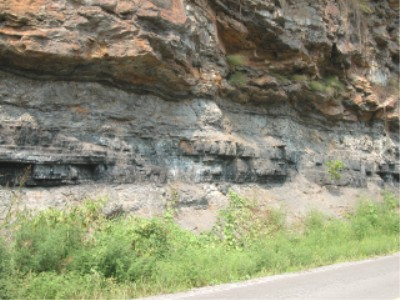
Bituminous coal seam in West Virginia

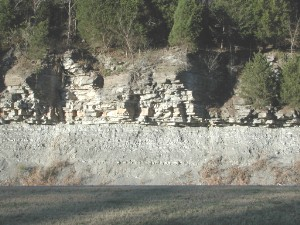
Limey shale overlaid by limestone. Cumberland Plateau, Tennessee

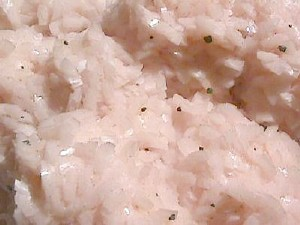
Dolomite crystals from Touissite, Morocco

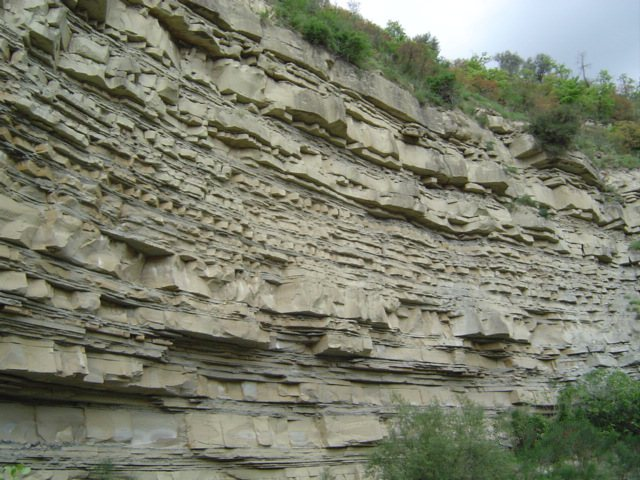
Turbidite (Gorgoglione Flysch), Miocene, South Italy

- Argillite – Sedimentary rock, mostly of indurated clay particles
- Arkose – Type of sandstone containing at least 25% feldspar
- Banded iron formation – Layered iron-rich sedimentary rock
- Breccia – Rock composed of angular fragments
- Calcarenite – Type of limestone that is composed predominantly of sand-size grains
- Chalk – Soft carbonate rock
- Chert – Hard, fine-grained sedimentary rock composed of cryptocrystalline silica
- Claystone – Clastic sedimentary rock composed primarily of clay-sized particles
- Coal – Combustible sedimentary rock composed primarily of carbon
- Conglomerate – Sedimentary rock composed of smaller rock fragments
- Coquina – Sedimentary rock that is composed mostly of fragments of shells
- Diamictite – Type of sedimentary rock
- Diatomite – Soft, siliceous sedimentary rock that is easily crumbled
- Dolomite (rock), also known as Dolostone – Sedimentary carbonate rock containing a high percentage of the mineral dolomite
- Evaporite – Water-soluble mineral deposit formed by evaporation from an aqueous solution
- Flint – Cryptocrystalline form of the mineral quartz
- Geyserite – Form of opaline silica often found around hot springs and geysers
- Greywacke – Sandstone with angular grains in a clay-fine matrix
- Gritstone – Hard, coarse-grained, siliceous sandstone
- Ironstone – Sedimentary rock that contains a substantial proportion of iron ore
- Itacolumite – Porous sandstone known for flexibility
- Jaspillite – Banded mixture of hematite and quartz
- Laterite – Product of rock weathering in wet tropical climates rich in iron and aluminium
- Lignite – Soft, brown, combustible, sedimentary rock
- Limestone – Type of sedimentary rock
- Marl – Lime-rich mud or mudstone which contains variable amounts of clays and silt
- Mudstone – Fine grained sedimentary rock whose original constituents were clays or muds
- Oil shale – Organic-rich fine-grained sedimentary rock containing kerogen
- Oolite – Sedimentary rock formed from ooids
- Phosphorite – Sedimentary rock containing large amounts of phosphate minerals – A non-detrital sedimentary rock that contains high amounts of phosphate minerals
- Sandstone – Type of sedimentary rock
- Shale – Fine-grained, clastic sedimentary rock
- Siltstone – Sedimentary rock which has a grain size in the silt range
- Sylvinite – Sedimentary rock made of a mechanical mixture of sylvite and halite
- Tillite – Till which has been indurated or lithified by burial
- Travertine – Form of limestone deposited by mineral springs
- Tufa – Porous variety of limestone rock
- Turbidite – Geologic deposit of a turbidity current
- Wackestone – Mud-supported carbonate rock that contains greater than 10% grains

== Metamorphic rocks ==
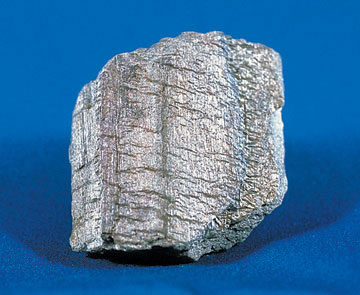
Phyllite

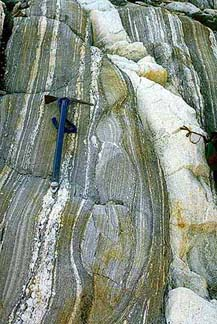
Banded gneiss with a dike of granite orthogneiss

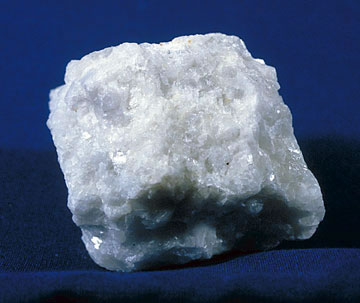
Marble

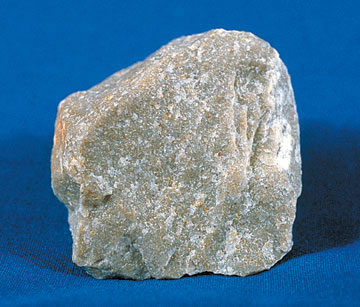
Quartzite

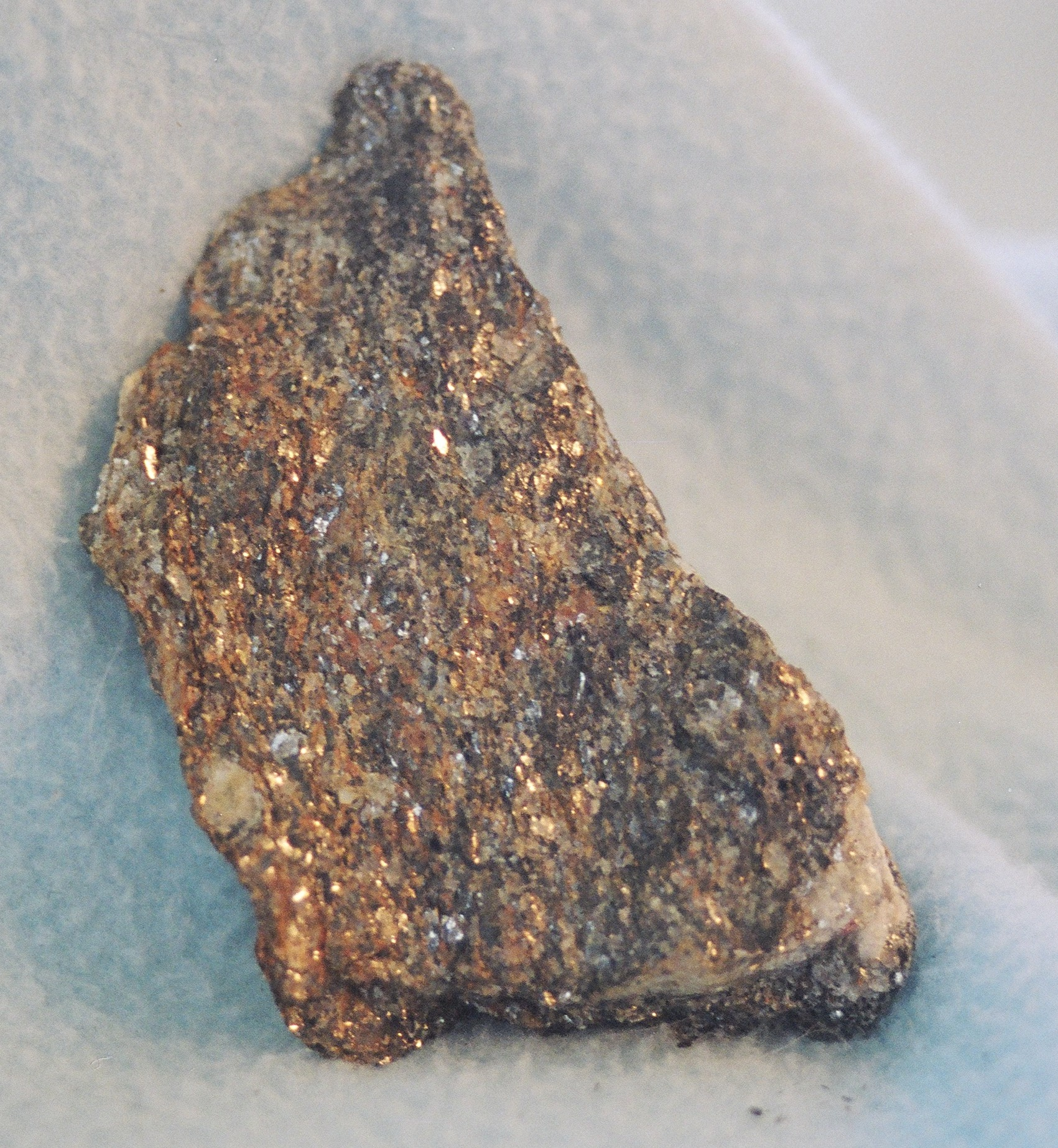
Manhattan Schist, from Southeastern New York

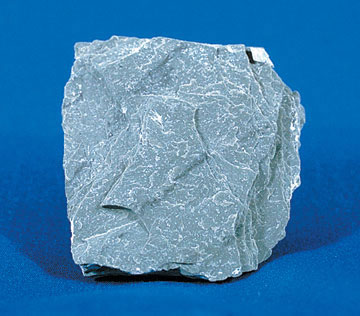
Slate

- Anthracite – Hard, compact variety of coal
- Amphibolite – Metamorphic rock type
- Blueschist – Type of metavolcanic rock
- Cataclasite – Rock found at geological faults – A rock formed by faulting
- Eclogite – Metamorphic rock formed under high pressure
- Gneiss – Common high-grade metamorphic rock
- Granulite – Class of high-grade medium to coarse grained metamorphic rocks
- Greenschist – Metamorphic rock – A mafic metamorphic rock dominated by green amphiboles
- Hornfels – Group of metamorphic rocks
  - Calcflinta – Calc-silicate hornfels
- Jadeitite – Metamorphic rock found in blueschist-grade metamorphic terranes
- Litchfieldite – Igneous rock – Nepheline syenite gneiss
- Marble – Type of metamorphic rock – a metamorphosed limestone
- Migmatite – Mixture of metamorphic rock and igneous rock
- Mylonite – Metamorphic rock – A metamorphic rock formed by shearing
- Metaconglomerate - A type of metamorphic rock formed through the recrystallization of conglomerates
- Metapelite – Metamorphic rock – A metamorphic rock with a protolith of clay-rich (siltstone) sedimentary rock
- Metapsammite – A metamorphic rock with a protolith of quartz-rich (sandstone) sedimentary rock
- Phyllite – Type of foliated metamorphic rock – A low grade metamorphic rock composed mostly of micaceous minerals
- Pseudotachylite – Glassy or very fine-grained type of rock – A glass formed by melting within a fault via friction
- Quartzite – Hard, non-foliated metamorphic rock – A metamorphosed sandstone typically composed of >95% quartz
- Schist – Easily split medium-grained metamorphic rock
- Semipelite – Metamorphic rock – that falls between pelitic (clay-rich) and psammitic (sand-rich) compositions
- Serpentinite – Rock formed by transformation of olivine
- Skarn – Hard, coarse-grained, hydrothermally altered metamorphic rocks
- Slate – Metamorphic rock - A low grade metamorphic rock formed from shale or silt
- Suevite – Rock consisting partly of melted material formed during an impact event – A rock formed by partial melting during a meteorite impact
- Talc carbonate – A metamorphosed ultramafic rock with talc as an essential constituent; similar to a serpentinite
  - Soapstone – Talc-bearing metamorphic rock – Essentially a talc schist
- Tectonite – Rock whose structure reflects its history of deformation
- Whiteschist – Type of metamorphic rock – A high pressure metamorphic rock containing talc and kyanite

== Specific varieties ==
The following are terms for rocks that are not petrographically or genetically distinct but are defined according to various other criteria; most are specific classes of other rocks, or altered versions of existing rocks. Some archaic and vernacular terms for rocks are also included.

- Adamellite – Type of igneous rock – A variety of quartz monzonite
- Appinite – Type of igneous rock – A group of varieties of lamprophyre, mostly rich in hornblende
- Aphanite – Igneous rock composed of very small crystals invisible to the naked eye
- Borolanite – Variety of nepheline syenite from Loch Borralan, Scotland – A variety of nepheline syenite from Loch Borralan, Scotland
- Blue Granite – Variety of monzonite, an igneous rock
- Epidosite – Hydrothermally altered epidote- and quartz-bearing rock
- Felsite – Very fine-grained volcanic rock that sometimes contains larger crystals
- Flint – Cryptocrystalline form of the mineral quartz
- Ganister – Hard, fine-grained quartzose sandstone, or orthoquartzite
- Gossan – Intensely oxidized, weathered or decomposed rock
- Hyaloclastite – Volcanic rock consisting of glass fragments
- Ijolite – Igneous rock consisting essentially of nepheline and augite
- Jadeitite – Metamorphic rock found in blueschist-grade metamorphic terranes
- Jasperoid – Type of rock – A hematite-silica metasomatite analogous to a skarn
- Kenyte – Type of igneous rock - A variety of phonolite, first found on Mount Kenya
- Lapis lazuli – Metamorphic rock containing lazurite, prized for its intense blue color - A rock composed of lazurite and other minerals
- Larvikite – Variety of monzonite, an igneous rock
- Listwanite – Metamorphic rock
- Litchfieldite – Igneous rock – A metamorphosed nepheline syenite occurrence near Litchfield, Maine
- Llanite – Type of rock – A hypabyssal rhyolite with microcline and blue quartz phenocrysts from the Llano Uplift in Texas
- Luxullianite – Rare type of granite
- Mangerite – Plutonic intrusive igneous rock, that is essentially a hypersthene-bearing monzonite
- Minette (ore) – Type of iron ore found in the south of Luxembourg and in Lorraine – A variety of lamprophyre
- Novaculite – Type of rock – A type of chert found in Oklahoma, Arkansas, and Texas
- Pietersite – Variety of chalcedony
- Pyrolite – Model composition of the Earth's mantle – A chemical analogue considered to theoretically represent the Earth's upper mantle
- Rapakivi granite – Type of igneous rock
- Rhomb porphyry – Textural form of igneous rock with large grained crystals in a fine matrix – A type of latite with euhedral rhombic phenocrysts of feldspar
- Rodingite – Metamorphic rock – A mafic rock metasomatized by serpentinization fluids
- Shonkinite – Intrusive igneous rock – melitilic and kalsititic rocks
- Taconite – Variety of iron-bearing sedimentary rock
- Tachylite – Form of basaltic volcanic glass
- Teschenite – Type of igneous rock – A silica undersaturated, analcime bearing gabbro
- Theralite – Igneous rock – A nepheline gabbro
- Unakite – Multicoloured metamorphic rock – An altered granite
- Variolite – Igneous rocks which contain varioles
- Vogesite – Type of ultrapotassic igneous rock – A variety of lamprophyre
- Wad (mineral) – Porous secondary manganese oxyhydroxide – A rock rich in manganese oxide or manganese hydroxide

== See also ==
- List of minerals
- List of rocks on Mars
- Rock cycle – Transitional concept of geologic time
- List of rock formations: for a list of unusual or culturally significant rock outcrops
- Leaverite – Rock in the field that looks interesting but is actually not
