= Famatinian orogeny =

Paleozoic geological event in South America

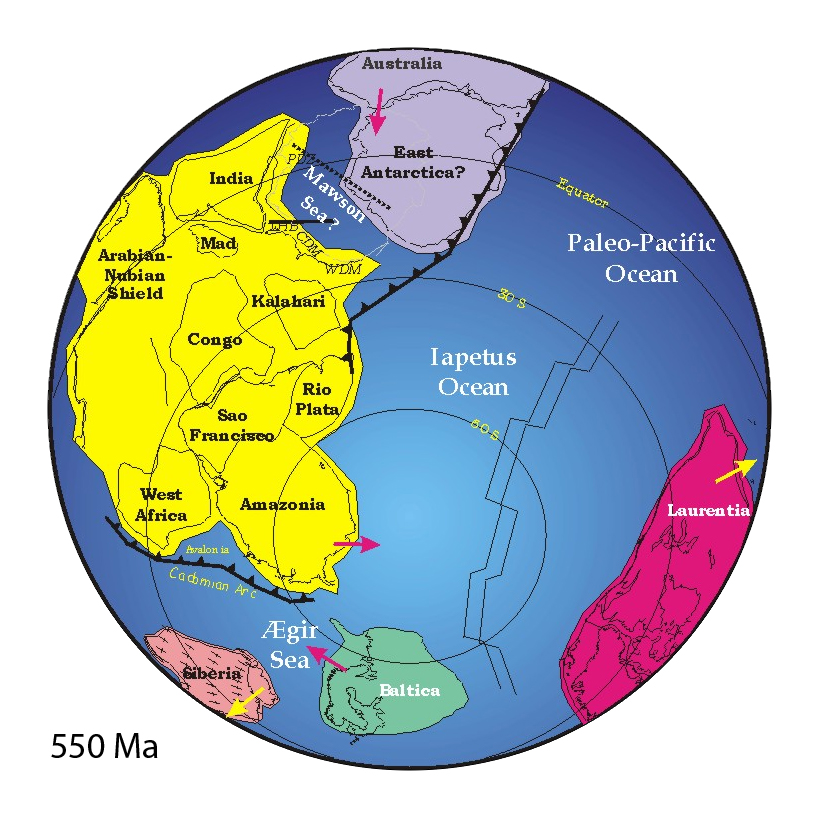
Paleogeographic reconstruction of Gondwana and Laurentia about 70 million years before the Famatinian orogeny. The Famatinian orogeny took place near the right border of the area marked as "Río Plata". Terranes and microcontinents such as Cuyania, Pampia and Chilenia are omitted.

The Famatinian orogeny (Spanish: Orogenia de Famatina) is an orogeny that predates the rise of the Andes and that took place in what is now western South America (Note: All coordinates in this article are in relation to present-day geography and not to the past disposition of continents, terranes and oceans.) during the Paleozoic, leading to the formation of the Famatinian orogen also known as the Famatinian belt. The Famatinian orogeny lasted from the Late Cambrian to at least the Late Devonian and possibly the Early Carboniferous, with orogenic activity peaking about 490 to 460 million years ago. The orogeny involved metamorphism and deformation in the crust and the eruption and intrusion of magma along a Famatinian magmatic arc that formed a chain of volcanoes. The igneous rocks of the Famatinian magmatic arc are of calc-alkaline character and include gabbros, tonalites, granodiorites and trondhjemites. The youngest igneous rocks of the arc are granites.

Part of the pegmatite dykes of the Pampean Pegmatite Province formed during the orogeny. These dykes are thought to be derived from S-type granitic melts.

The relationship of the orogeny with the Achala and Cerro Aspero batholiths of central Argentina is not fully understood. These Devonian batholiths are possibly of post-orogenic character.

== Outcrops and sediments ==
The Famatinian orogen's main outcrops lie in Sierras Pampeanas in northwestern Argentina. Only the western part of Sierras Pampeanas bears evidence of the Famatinian orogeny; the eastern parts appear to have been largely unaffected. In northern Chile the Belén Metamorphic Complex is thought to have been subject to metamorphism that was "time-equivalent" to the Famatinian orogeny in the early Paleozoic. It can this be considered part of the orogen in a broad sense. To the south in La Pampa Province, outcrops associated with the orogeny are scarce since most of that region has become blanketed by much more recent Quaternary sediments.

In Peru's Cordillera Oriental a "Famatinian" orogeny exists which is coeval with the classical Famatinian orogeny found further south. In the time-span from 480 Ma to 435 Ma (Late Cambrian to Silurian) rocks of Cordillera Oriental were deformed and a magmatic arc developed.

Towards what is now the east of the Famatinian magmatic arc a Precambrian sedimentary basin developed into a back-arc basin during the Ordovician. This basin went from Peru, through Bolivia to northwestern Argentina. The basin collected sediments from the Famatinian orogen and arc and while it did not contain oceanic crust it was a marine basin.

Plutonic rocks cropping out in Cordón de Lila and Sierra de Almeida south of Salar de Atacama in Chile formed in the Cambrian and Ordovician in association with the orogeny. The compositions of the plutonic rocks are granodiorite and monzogranite that are either metaluminous or peraluminous. These rocks are remnants of the magmatism along the western rim of the Famatinian orogeny.

== Plate tectonic setting ==
Famatinian arc magmatism was caused by the subduction of Iapetus Ocean lithosphere beneath Gondwana. As subduction went on, the peak of the orogeny resulted from the collision of the Cuyania terrane with Pampia in the Ordovician.

It has been suggested that the coeval Appalachian Taconic orogeny is the "northward" continuation of the Famatinian orogeny. (Note: In other words: what is at present the northern end of the Famatinian orogen would have been connected with what is currently the southern end of the Taconic orogen.) This has been explained by adding that the continent Laurentia could have collided with Gondwana (at what is today western South America) in early Paleozoic times due to the closure of the Iapetus Ocean. Supporting this hypothesis is the suggestion that the orogens have "truncated ends" that can be matched and that both share the commonality of having carbonate platform sediments at what is today their western side. Further, in the mentioned sediments both orogens host similar Olenellid trilobite faunas, something that is not expected to be unless both orogens had some sort of contact. This is because trilobites are unable to cross deep ocean basins. According to this view the Cuyania terrane would be an allochthonous block of Laurentian origin that was left in Gondwana after the continents went apart. But such views are not unchallenged since Cuyania is alternatively suggested to have drifted across Iapetus Ocean as a microcontinent starting in Laurentia and accreting then to Gondwana. Further a third model claims Cuyania is para-autochthonous and arrived at its current place by strike-slip fault movements starting not from Laurentia but from another region of Gondwana. The fact that Precordillera terrane has many trilobite genera in common with Laurentia but many species are endemic have led to some differing interpretations on what paleogeographic and tectonic history conditions are plausible explanations for this biogeography.
