= Sierra de Almeida =

Mountain range in Chile

Coordinates: 24°21′47″S 68°31′35″W

Sierra Almeida is a mountain range of the Andes located in northern Chile, south of both Cordón de Lila and Salar de Atacama. Geologically it is made up of a batholith of Cambrian and Ordovician age. The rocks of Sierra Almeida are the result of pre-Andean magmatism that occurred during the Famatinian orogeny. The compositions of the plutonic rocks are granodiorite and monzogranite that are either metaluminous or marginally peraluminous. These rocks are remnants of the magmatism along the western rim of the Famatinian orogeny.
