= Appinite =

Type of igneous rock

Appinite is an amphibole-rich plutonic rock of high geochemical variability. Appinites are therefore regarded as a rock series comprising hornblendites, meladiorites, diorites, but also granodiorites and granites. Appinites have formed from magmas very rich in water. They occur in very different geological environments. The ultimate source region of these peculiar rocks is the upper mantle, which was altered metasomatically and geochemically before melting.

== Etymology ==
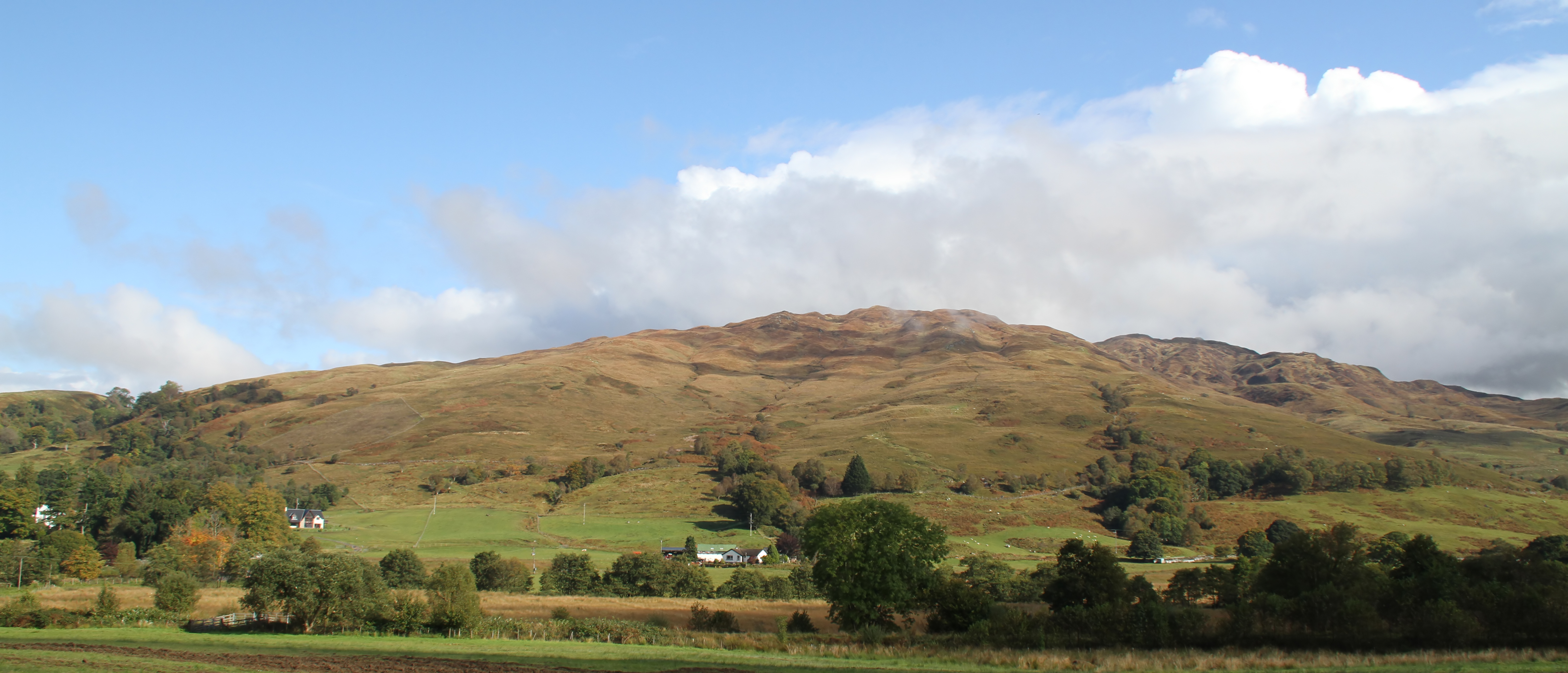
Countryside near the type locality Appin

The rock appinite was named after its type locality Appin near Ballachulish in Scotland. Appin was originally called An Appain in Scottish Gaelic. This is derived from Middle Irish apdain or from Old Irish aibit with the meaning of abbey – referring to the ancient abbey on the neighbouring island Lismore.

== Definition ==
Bailey and Maufe (1916) defined appinite originally as

a medium- to coarse-grained, meso- to melanocratic igneous rock, that stands out by conspicuous crystals of hornblende, which are enclosed by a matrix of plagioclase (oligoclase to andesine) and/or orthoclase. Quartz often is present, but can also be absent.

Generally, appinites are plutonic equivalents of calc-alkaline lamprophyres such as vogesite and spessartite.

== Introduction ==
Appinites – often synonymously used for hornblende diorites – are a coeval rock suite of plutonic or subvolcanic igneous rocks with variable chemical compositions, covering ultramafic to felsic igneous rocks. They are characterized in all their lithologies by euhedral hornblende crystals as the dominant mafic mineral. Hornblende mainly appears as big prismatic phenocrysts, but can also be found in the groundmass.

On top appinites have very different textures – featuring planar and linear magmatic fabrics, cumulate textures, intercumulate textures and also poikilitic fabrics. They also can occur as mafic pegmatites and show common mixing and mingling between coeval mafic and felsic magmas. Often they are variably contaminated by the country rocks.

Most appinites crystallize from an important gas phase. This implies an anomalously water-rich magma including both mantle components and meteoric components. The appinite suite therefore offers a unique occasion to study the role of water in the production and in the crystallization history of mafic to felsic magmas, but also more generally in intrusional processes.

Appinitic intrusions possess a whole gamut of differing plutonic bodies and show very different ways of emplacement. Most of the appinites precede granitic intrusions, but can appear also at the same time. This can be perfectly observed at the Ardara pluton in Donegal. Their emplacement is usually directed by tectonics – especially by important shear zones, who potentially facilitate the rising of the magmas through the crust.

== General remarks ==
In general, appinites appear as relatively small, rather flat intrusional bodies in the crust. Their diameter never exceeds more than two kilometers – like for instance the defining appinites in Scotland. Appinites rose along the periphery of granitic plutons and usually are associated with important, deep reaching faults along which they ascended into higher crustal levels.

Often appinites – and likewise the Scottish appinites – get tied up with active subduction, the formation of granitoids and also the termination of subduction by slab breakoff. In the case of the Scottish appinites it is believed that they only formed once the Iapetus Ocean was closed by continental collision between the southern continental margin of Laurentia and the northwestern side of Eastern Avalonia and that the subduction within Iapetus had stopped.

Yet newer geochronological studies seem to indicate, that the relation between subduction, appinite formation and granite magmatism involves a rather lengthy process.

It is also believed that the mafic component of appinites only was able to form once the subducting plate had broken off enabling hot asthenospheric material to flow in through the gap. The asthenospheric extra heat initiated magmas containing juvenile mantle components, but also components of Subcontinental Lithospheric Mantle (SCLM). Furthermore, the magmas show affinities to Shoshonites. The felsic components of appinites are connected to big batholiths with fractional crystallization being the main petrogenetic process. The assimilation of country rocks was of hardly any importance.

== Occurrences and ages ==
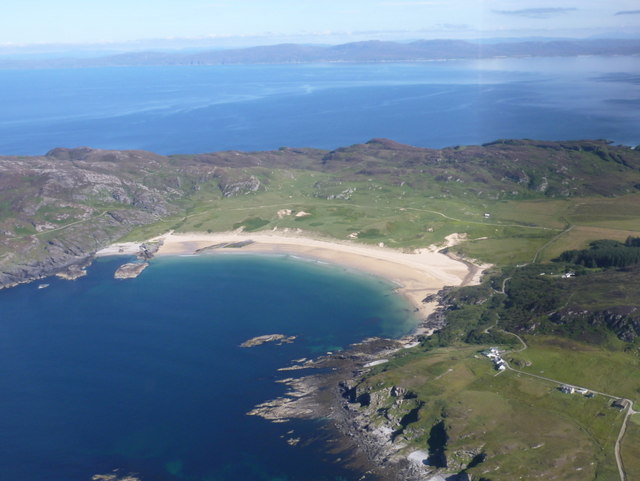
Colonsay – Kiloran Bay as seen from the west – with two little appinite outcrops along the northern side of the bay

Appinites occur more or less worldwide. Temporally, the oldest appinites are 2700 million years old (the Neoarchaean Era); the youngest are of Holocene age. The Neoarchaean appinites are associated genetically with coeval sanukitoids. This is often taken as proof for plate tectonics going back that far in time.

Besides the type locality in the Scottish caledonides (within the Central Highlands terrane or Grampian terrane) appinites also occur in Ireland within and in the vicinity of the Donegal batholith – especially in association with the Ardara pluton – but also within the Leinster granite and within the Galway granite batholith.

All these appinites have Silurian ages. Further occurrences in Scotland are found near Loch Lomond and in central Sutherland, which already belongs to the Northern Highlands terrane. The appinites in the Northern Highlands terrane are mainly associated with the Ratagain complex, the Rogart granite and the Strontian granite. The appinites from the Rogart granite and from the Strontian granite also have Silurian ages and are between 425 and 420 million years old.

So far the oldest known appinites come from northern Michigan. They go back in time roughly 2700 million years and belong to the Northern Complex – a greenstone belt along the southern edge of the Superior craton.

Fairly old appinites are reported from Canada, for instance from the Frog Lake hornblende gabbro situated within the late neoproterozoic Avalon terrane in Nova Scotia. The Wamsutta diorite in the White Mountains of New Hampshire also has similarities with appinites. The diorite is 408 million years old and belongs to the Acadian Orogeny.

Younger appinites from the Carboniferous appear near Puebla de Sanabria in the Variscides of northwestern Spain. They are also found in the Avila batholith. Amongst Variscan occurrences appinites often carry local names like Durbachites (in the Black Forest), Redwitzites (in the Fichtelgebirge), Vaugnerites (in the French Massif Central), and sometimes they also hide under the header High Ba Sr Granitoids (an example being the Rogart Granite in Scotland).

Variscan appinites can also be found in the Southern Alps of Northern Italy. They are associated here with the permian Serie dei Laghi – a rock series of gabbros and granites. The age of these Italian appinites is about 285 million years.

In Asia appinites are known to occur in China and in Tibet.

In China appinites appear in the Upper Ordovician (495 - 452 million years) Datong Pluton of the Western Kunlun. and again in the Triassic Laocheng Pluton of the Qinling During the Upper Permian appinites formed along the northern edge of the North China Craton (in northwestern Liaoning) and during the Triassic in Heilongjiang (near Duobaoshan), also belonging to the North China Craton.

In the Tibetan Himalaya Appinite-cumulates are found in the Gangdese batholith of the Lhasa terrane. These appinites formed during the Upper Triassic and are 220 to 213 million years old. Another appinite association in Tibet occurs near Pengcuolin northwest of Xigazê. It belongs to the southern Lhasa terrane and is only 51 million years old i.e. Ypresian (Eocene).

Very young examples of appinites come from Iran, like appinites from the Baneh Pluton in the Zagros. These appinites are 40 million years old and stem from the Middle Eocene. They mark the Zagros Suture Zone. At about the same time appinites also formed near Sardasht more to the northwest.

== Mineralogy ==
Appinites consist mainly of amphibole (hornblende) taking up between 50 and 80 volume percent. Anorthite-rich plagioclase with An_{50-70} reaches about 20 vol. %. The rest is made up of clinopyroxene (5 to 15 vol. %) and olivine (5 to 10 vol. %). Some biotite and occasional phlogopite are also encountered. In more felsic appinites appear alkali feldspar and quartz. Represented amongst the accessory minerals are sphene, ilmenite, zircon and apatite. Allanite can be found in more felsic members.

A special occurrence is myrmekite found in an appinite of the Italian Serie dei Laghi – indicating metasomatic alterations.

Amongst the amphiboles (mainly brown amphiboles, but also some greenish amphiboles) two populations with high and low aluminium content can be differentiated. Tschermakite and magnesiohastingsite are rich in aluminium, whereas magnesiohornblende contains much less. Plagioclase can also be subdivided into two groups – one anorthite-rich with An_{80-88} and the other anorthite-poor with An_{36-52}. Plagioclase with a high anorthite component is surrounded by amphiboles or mantled by plagioclases with a low anorthite component. Therefore, it can be assumed, that plagioclase crystallized before amphibole. The grain size of amphiboles varies from 2 millimeters to several centimeters.

Plagioclase, olivine and clinopyroxene settled as cumulates, whereas amphiboles grew afterwards as intercumulate crystals which also can show corona textures.

== Petrology ==
=== Major elements ===
Amongst the major elements the SiO_{2} contents of the appinite suite usually vary between 42 and 61 weight %. The rocks are therefore ultramafic, mafic and intermediate in their geochemical composition. Felsic end members can reach up to 72.1 weight % SiO_{2}. The SiO_{2} contents correspond with the rock types cortlandtite (a melagabbro), hornblendite, hornblende diorite, meladiorite and diorite, the felsic end members with granodiorite till granite.

The Al_{2}O_{3} contents vary between 13 and 22 weight %. Appinites are metaluminous with A/NK > 1 and A/CNK < 1. The contents of MgO fall between 5 and 16 weight % and the magnesium numbers generally oscillate between 0.22 and 0.57 (or between 22 and 57). Appinites are magnesian rocks (and not ferroan), because in the relation SiO_{2} plotted against Fe_{2}O_{3}tot/(Fe_{2}O_{3}tot + MgO) their values are always lower than 0.66. Their magnesium contents are higher than what can be expected from melting of metabasalts and they approach sanukitoids of modern island arcs. The K_{2}O contents vary between 0.5 and 4.0 weight %, appinites are thus calc-alkaline (middle K and high K). Strongly differentiated samples can even touch into the shoshonitic field. With a value of 0.3 weight % K_{2}O the appinite from Kilrean has not been differentiated at all and represents an island arc tholeiite. The ratio Na_{2}O/K_{2}O is rather high in appinites (right up to 5.43) and is similar to Cenozoic adakites, which were produced by the melting of subducted oceanic crust. Accordingly, appinites are a rock suite dominated by sodium.

In the TAS diagram appinites appear mainly in the subalcaline field, but they can extend into the alcaline field. They plot in the fields of basalt, basaltic andesite and andesite, but touch as well the fields of basanite, trachybasalt, basaltic trachyandesite and trachyandesite. The magmatic equivalents are gabbro, gabbroic diorite and diorite, extending towards peridotgabbro, foidgabbro, monzogabbro and monzodiorite. Monzonite hardly ever is realized.

The following table shows major element compositions of several appinites – in comparison with the lamprophyre from Narin-Portnoo:

Oxide weight %	Appinite Meenalargan	Appinite Narin-Portnoo	Appinite Colonsay	Appinite Serie dei Laghi 1	Appinite Serie dei Laghi 2	Laocheng Appinite 1	Laocheng Appinite 2	Appinite Pengcuolin	Lamprophyre Narin-Portnoo
SiO_{2}	48.90	50.20	52.30	49.76	56.03	46.55	50.44	41.16–48.13	49.37
TiO_{2}	1.65	1.00	0.72	1.64	1.02	2.33	0.73	0.79–2.22	3.15
Al_{2}O_{3}	15.51	14.30	15.23	17.01	15.36	15.59	12.18	16.20–18.26	13.42
Fe_{2}O_{3}tot	9.18	7.70	7.59	10.83	8.04	11.48	8.31	9.65–16.21	14.29
MnO	0.13	0.10	0.14	0.19	0.13	0.15	0.13		0.23
MgO	9.10	7.90	5.77	5.58	8.30	7.62	10.58	5.25–8.66	5.64
CaO	9.96	11.80	7.85	9.84	6.59	8.16	13.15	10.10–11.48	9.90
Na_{2}O	2.60	2.80	2.16	2.74	2.74	3.61	1.89	1.86–2.79	2.57
K_{2}O	1.20	1.00	3.00	2.03	1.56	2.37	0.91	0.49–0.90	0.51
P_{2}O_{5}	0.37	0.30	1.11	0.35	0.22	0.76	0.17		0.36
LOI	2.20	2.40	1.85	0.03	0.01	1.73	1.58		0.56
Mg#	0.35	0.41	0.62	0.50	0.67	0.60	0.74	0.39 – 0.61	0.46
Na/K	3.30	4.26	1.09	2.06	2.66	2.31	3.14	2.48 – 5.43	7.69
Al/K+Na	2.79	2.51	2.24	2.54	2.48	1.83	2.97		2.81
Al/K+Na+Ca	0.66	0.53	0.72	0.69	0.84	0.67	0.43		0.59

=== Trace elements ===
Amongst the trace elements the mafic members of appinites manifest high concentrations in transitional metals like nickel (98-288 ppm), chromium (100-810 ppm) and vanadium (179-462 ppm). The large-ion lithophile elements (LILE), for example rubidium, potassium, barium (253-528 ppm), cesium and strontium (415-813 ppm), also have elevated concentrations – and so do the light rare-earth elements (LREE). Low in concentration are the heavy rare-earth elements (HREE) and also the high field strength elements (HFSE) niobium, tantalium, zirconium, phosphorus, titanium and thorium. Still the HFSE are higher concentrated than in the associated granodiorites and granites. Compared with chondrites the LREE show an enrichment by factors 20-200. The HREE fractionation (expressed through the ratio Gd_{N}/Yb_{N}) shows values between 1.4 and 6.1. A positive europium anomaly is very weakly expressed and in more felsic appinites the anomaly turns slightly negative (0.96-0.70). The values for yttrium are rather low (17-30 ppm).

The high concentrations in the elements Mg, Ni, Cr and Ba point towards a mantle source region.

Compared with MORBs the elements rubidium, barium, potassium and also cerium are strongly enriched, yet titanium, ytterbium and yttrium are depleted.

The following table shows trace elements of different appinites:

Trace elements ppm	Appinite Meenalargan	Appinite Narin-Portnoo	Appinite Serie dei Laghi 1	Appinite Serie dei Laghi 2	Laocheng Appinite 1	Laocheng Appinite 2
Pb	–	11.0	–	–	4.90	4.94
Ni	95	35	22	128	127	125
Cr	–	–	93	374	650	677
V	271	230	–	–	193	194
Zr	76	62	114	141	72.2	69.1
Y	30.0	18.0	33.0	24.0	17.1	17.5
Sr	813	415	401	370	635	596
Ba	336	–	125	294	347	332
Rb	37.0	31.0	72.0	70.0	58.6	38.7
Nb	4.0	4.0	11.0	9.0	4.17	4.21

=== Isotopes ===
According to Harmon et al. (1984) appinites possess the following ε_{Nd}-, ε_{Sr}- and ε_{Hf} values:

- ε_{Nd} varies between − 8 and + 2 (i. e. between 0.5123 and 0.51275 – in the Serie dei Laghi between 0.5119 and 0.5123 for ^{143}Nd/^{144}Nd)
- ε_{Sr} varies between − 5 und + 10 (i. e. between 0.7044 and 0.711 for ^{87}Sr/^{86}Sr).
- ε_{Hf(t)} in zircon varies between 3.3 and 7.9, but can descend to − 1.7.

Appinites prolong the mantle array into the field of negative ε_{Nd}. Yet their mafic members plot very close to enriched MORB (EMORB) with ε_{Nd} = + 2 and ^{87}Sr/^{86}Sr = 0.7048. Their ε_{Sr} falls slightly above 0.

Whole rock analyses for δ^{18}O delivered values of 6.7 ‰, yet for single minerals values from 4.3 to 6.1 ‰.

The isotopic ratio ^{206}Pb/^{204}Pb varies between 17.9 and 18.4.

== Geochemistry ==
The geochemical composition of appinites is mainly calc-alkaline, sometimes shoshonitic and rarely tholeiitic. Therefore, appinites resemble shoshonites, shoshonitic lamprophyres, but also magnesian andesites, sanukitoids, adakites and TTG rocks (tonalites, trondhjemites and granodiorites). The TTGs appear especially in the late Archean and during the Paleoproterozoic.

== Genesis ==
The appinites in western Scotland and in northwestern Ireland originated from a gas-rich basaltic magma. The occurrences near Ballachulish are calc-alkaline and belong to the high-K type. They are evolving towards more continental conditions. In contrast, the Ardara appinites show transitions from calc-alkaline towards tholeiitic, and were thus evolving towards island arc rocks. The Loch Lomond appinites are intermediate between the two, and they are common calc-alkaline rocks.

In the appinites from Ballachulish, olivine appears on the liquidus at a depth of about 70 to 80 kilometers, from where they ascended into overlying crustal domains. Their ascent was impeded by structural complications caused by folded rocks of the Dalradian Supergroup. Further crystallizations then happened under falling temperatures and rather variable gas pressures, caused by explosions within subvolcanic pipes.

Olivine crystallized first then clinopyroxene, amphibole, mica and plagioclase, creating a progressive rock suite covering ultramafic to felsic compositions.

Experimental and theoretical studies show that, with rising water pressure, the stability field of hornblende expands, restricting the stability fields of olivine and clinopyroxene. The characteristic textures of appinites point to rapid crystal growth. These studies also support the reduction of melt viscosity, whereby ions can be transported more effectively to the sites of mineral growth.

== Source region ==
The general source region of appinitic magmas is estimated to be situated at about 40 kilometers depth, just below the base of the continental crust. From there the magmas ascended and finally stalled at about 15 kilometers depth in upper crustal levels.

The water-bearing, basaltic appinitic magmas probably derive from underplated mafic sources with differing degrees of fractionation. They most likely resulted from subduction processes. From within the subcontinental lithospheric mantle they then rose into the MASH zone (abbreviation of Melting, Assimilation, Storage and Homogenisation) just above the MOHO. Here they engendered copious granitic magmas by partial melting processes.

It is assumed, that once the subduction came to an end water-bearing magmas rose from the underplated region into middle and upper crustal levels with 15 kilometers as upper intrusional depth level (corresponding to a pressure of 0.3 to 0.6 GPa or 3 to 6 kilobar). Here the magmas stalled, differentiated and crystallized under water-saturated conditions.

The granitic magmas also ascended in pulsating fashion and were making use of structures in the host rocks that were oriented to the local stress field in a favourable way – thus enabling the ascent. But later mafic pulses were hindered in their ascent by structurally higher, already crystallized granitic bodies – which functioned as rheological barriers. Still the appinite magmas were able to circumvent these barriers by using as ascent ways deep-reaching faults along the edges of the granitoids. According to this model appinites provide a direct link to mafic underplating. Their mafic members also offer insights into the formation of granitic batholiths – and more generally into the crustal growth process underneath island arcs.

== Melting ==
The melting of appinites was triggered by the incursion of hot and less viscous asthenospheric material. The incursion was due to slab breakoff after the collision of terranes or after outright continental collision. Another possibility is the opening of a slab window, which is resulting from the collision of a mid-ocean ridge with a subduction zone.

Mafic appinite magmas can contain a juvenile component. Neodymium isotopes show, however, that an additional SCLM-component was engaged. Quite often the SCLM-component had previously been metasomatized by hot fluids and magmas. This subcontinental lithospheric mantle component then was underplated by other mafics during subduction. Therefore, the composition of the mafic starting magmas can be quite variable for appinites. This explains, why certain appinite suites have calc-alkaline and others tholeiitic compositions – and therefore differ from the shoshonitic type locality.

Some felsic appinite magmas are thought to have formed by anatexis – and not by fractional crystallization.

== Overview ==
The overview centers on the example of the Pengcuolin appinite in the Tibetan Lhasa terrane. In this case the source region is assumed to be directly above oceanic crust of the Neotethys domain subducting northwards underneath the Tibetan Plateau, i.e. Eurasia. The pressure in the source region is estimated at 3.6 GPa corresponding to a depth of 120 kilometers. This is quite deep considering the above-mentioned value of 80 kilometers. An explanation is of course overthickened crust caused by the continental collision of India and Eurasia.

The subcontinental mantle rocks were of lherzolithic composition, to be more specific an olivine lherzolite.

The temperatures were estimated at fairly low 800 °C due to the subducted oceanic crust. The overlying subcontinental lherzolite was fluxed by fluids rising from the slab, became hydrated and was therefore metasomatized. Incoming asthenospheric material additionally provided heat to the lherzolite which was slowly rising, mainly along deep-reaching tectonic fracture zones. At a pressure of 2.7 GPa or 90 kilometers depth the lherzolite had reached a temperature of 1329 °C and started to melt. The primary magma rose quite quickly along faults within the subcontinental mantle. Having traversed the MOHO and arrived at 27 kilometers depth (corresponding to a pressure of 0.8 GPa) the melt collected in a first magma chamber. Plagioclase rich in anorthite began crystallizing and olivine plus pyroxene fractionated. This anorthite-rich appinitic magma kept on rising through the lower crust and stagnated once more at 16 kilometers depth (or at 0.5 GPa). Meanwhile, it had cooled down to just above 800 °C and started to crystallize aluminium-rich amphibole and plagioclase depleted in anorthite. The final batch of appinitic magma then finally stalled in the upper crust at a depth of 10 kilometers (or 0.3 GPa). The last crystals to settle out then were aluminium-poor amphibole and anorthite-poor plagioclase.

Heat and additional water contributed in the first magma chamber at 27 kilometers depth to produce felsic melts, which also rose into the upper crust and intruded as granitic plutons. The associated granitoids therefore owe their existence to the heat input of the appinites enabling lower crustal material to be melted anatectically. Consequently, appinites can be regarded as midwives of collisional granitoids.

== Literature ==
- Hamidullah, S. (1983). Petrogenetic studies of the appinite suite of western Scotland. Master's thesis University of Glasgow.
- Murphy, J. Brendan (2013). "Appinite suites: A record of the role of water in the genesis, transport, emplacement and crystallization of magma". Earth-Science Reviews. 119: 35–59. Bibcode:2013ESRv..119...35M. doi:10.1016/j.earscirev.2013.02.002.
- Murphy, J. Brendan; Nance, Damian; Gabler, Logan B.; Martell, Alexandra; Archibald, Douglas A. (2019). "Age, Geochemistry and Origin of the Ardara Appinite Plutons, Northwest Donegal, Ireland". Geoscience Canada. 46 (1): 31–48. doi:10.12789/geocanj.2019.46.144.
- Murphy, J. Brendan (2020). "Appinite suites and their genetic relationship with coeval voluminous granitoid batholiths". International Geology Review. 62, n. 6 (6): 683–713. Bibcode:2020IGRv...62..683M. doi:10.1080/00206814.2019.1630859.
- Murphy, J. Brendan; Collins, William J.; Archibald, Donnelly B. (2022). "Logan Medallist 7. Appinite Complexes, Granitoid Batholiths and Crustal Growth: A Conceptual Model". Geoscience Canada. 49 (3–4): 237–249. doi:10.12789/geocanj.2022.49.191.
- Pitcher, Wallace Spencer (1997). The nature and origin of granite. Chapman and Hall. ISBN 0-412-75860-1.
- Yarr, Timothy Roderick (1991). A petrological study of the appinite suite associated with the Ardara Pluton, Co. Donegal, Ireland. Master's thesis University of St Andrews.
