= Tin belt =

Tin belt may refer to

- Bolivian tin belt
- Southeast Asian tin belt
