= Geology of Andorra =

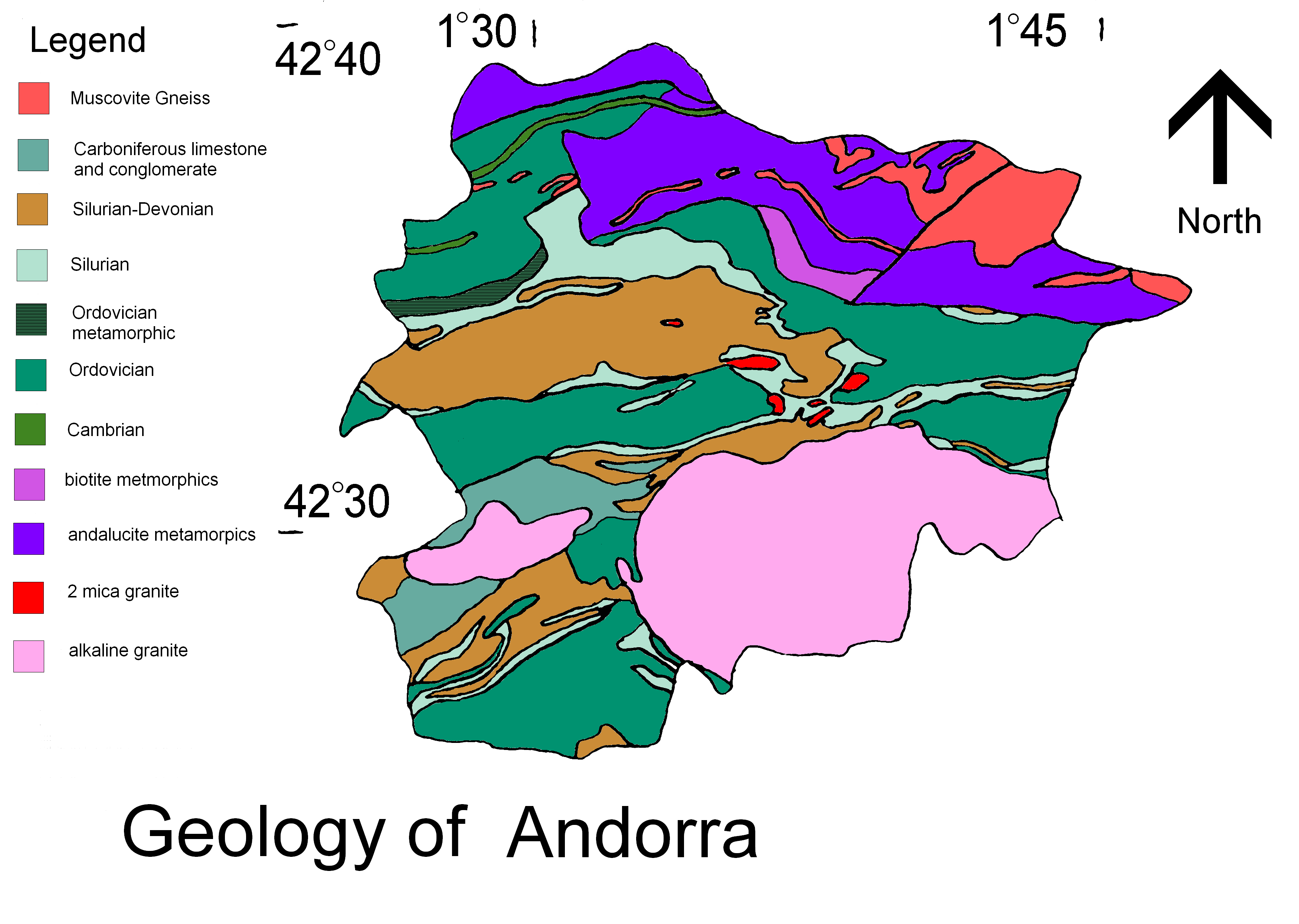

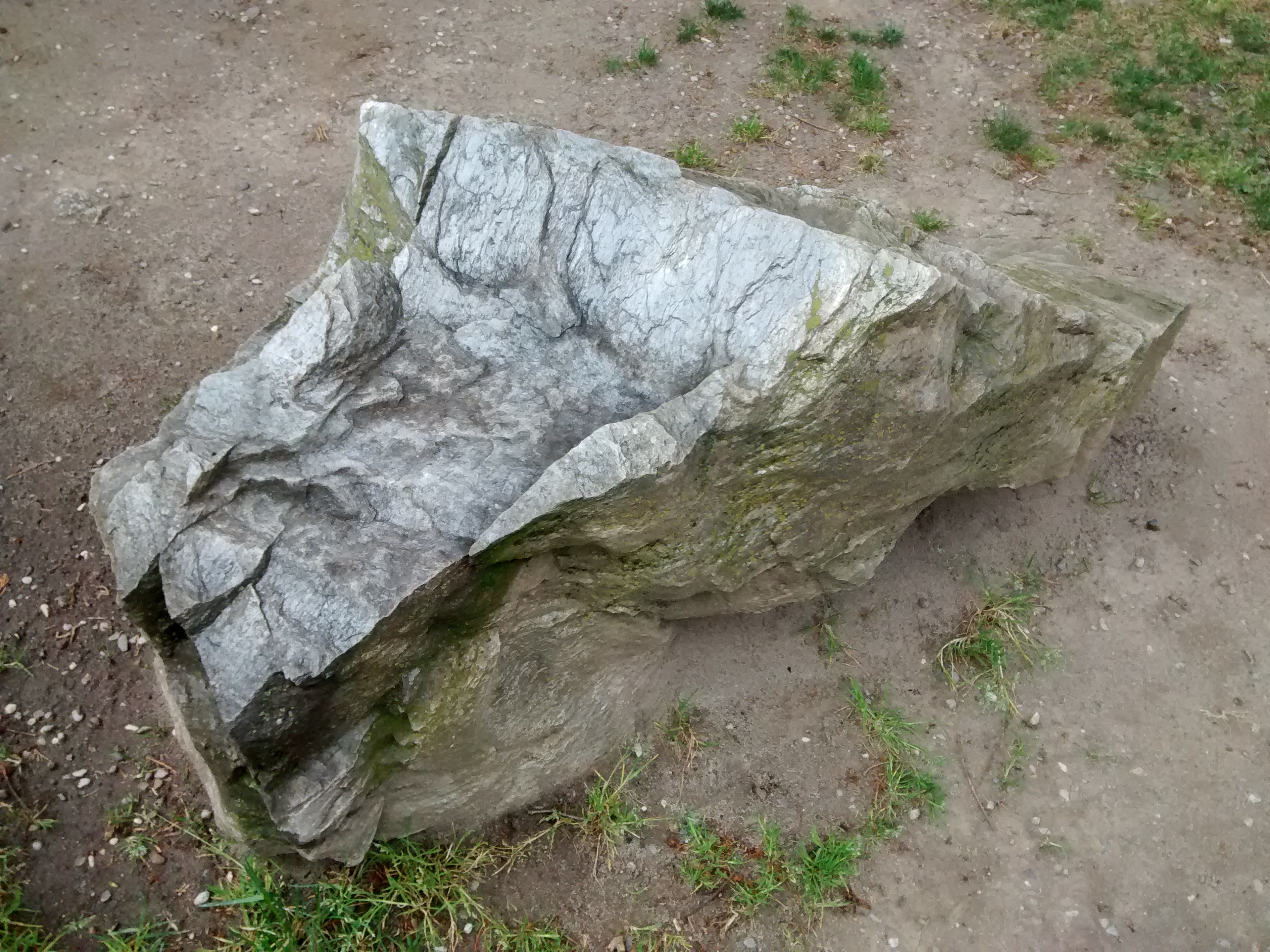
Andorran phyllite displayed in the Parc Central, Andorra la Vella

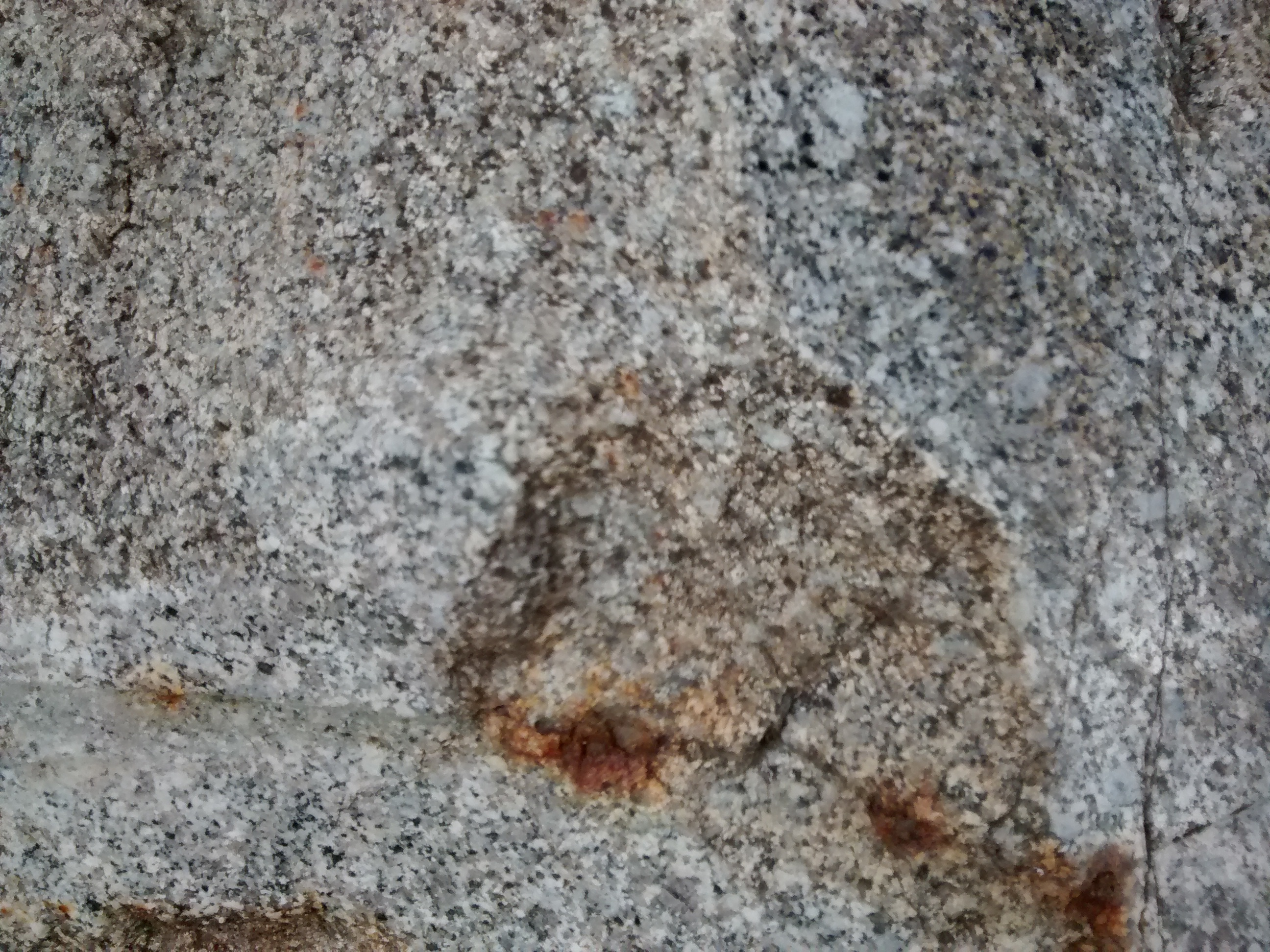
Granodiorite in Andorra

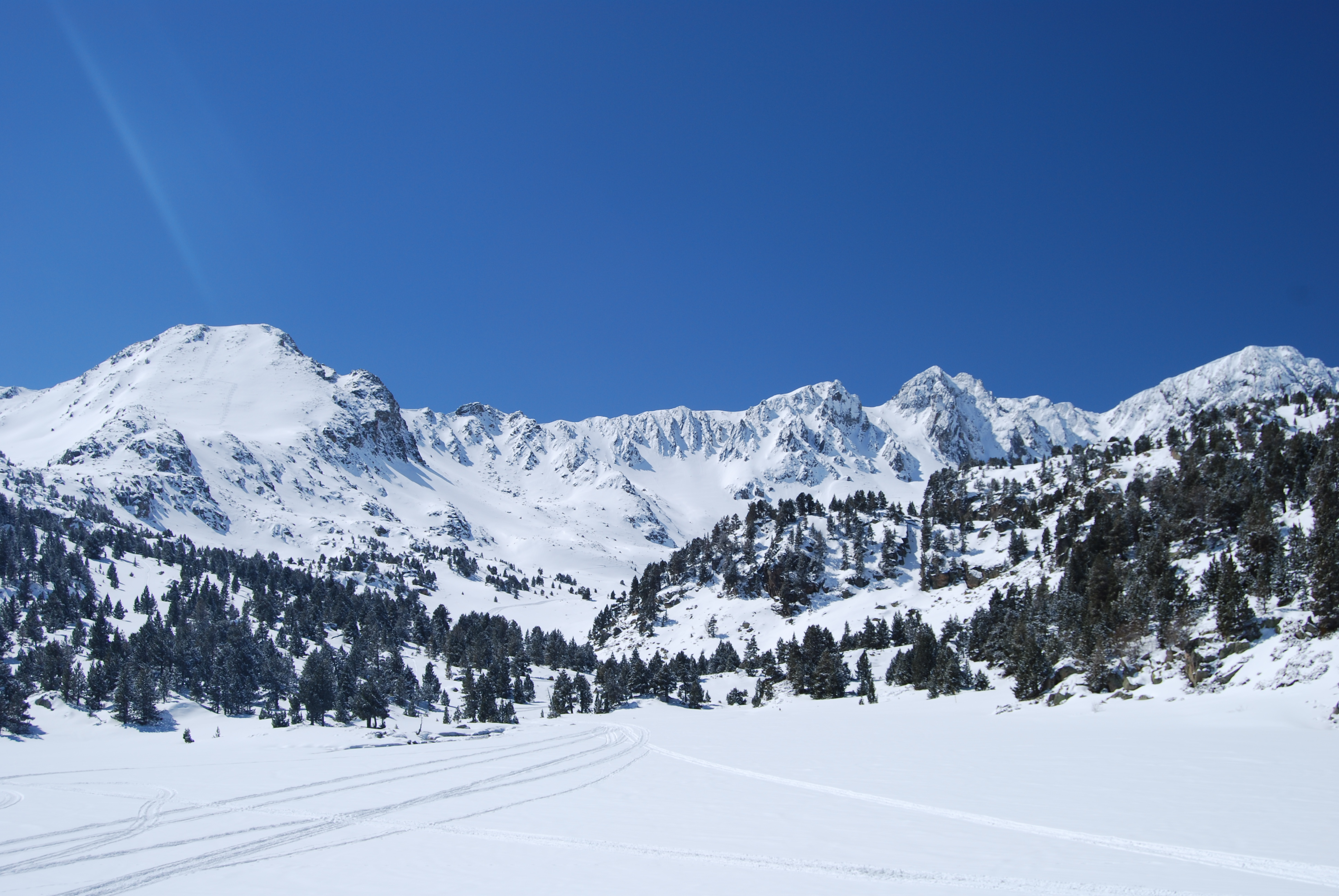
Cirque de Pessons

Andorra is located in the Axial Zone of the central Pyrenees mountain range in southwestern Europe, which means that it has intensely folded and thrust rocks formed when the Iberian Peninsula was rotated onto the European continent.

== Overview ==
Rocks from the Cambrian or Ordovician occur in the form of conglomerate, limestone, phyllite, quartzite, and slate. Diapirs of slate from the Silurian Period are found in the Llavirsi syncline near Bixessarri in the southwest. Gneiss and schist are found in the cores of anticlines in the northeast of the country. This gneiss contains muscovite. The antiforms are connected with near horizontal shear zones, containing nappes of metamorphosed sediments. Younger overlying Paleozoic metamorphosed sediments found over most of Andorra have also been steeply folded.

In the southeast of the country is an alkaline granite from a batholith called Mt-Louis-Andorra Batholith. It extends into Spain and covers an area of 600 km^{2} (230 sq mi). Different rock composition zones occur, with monzogranite found at the centre, quartz diorite at the edge and granodiorite in intermediate parts. The batholith has caused metamorphism on its western edge. The base of the batholith is exposed in the east of Andorra.

In the Central and Eastern Pyrenees, which includes Andorra, no fossils older than the Ordovician Caradoc 450–460 million years ago have been found.

== Glaciation ==
Andorra was extensively glaciated during the Quaternary; glaciers flowed down all of the major valleys of Andorra, merging into one large glacier at Escaldes-Engordany, which in the coldest stage reached as far south as Pont de la Fontaneda near Santa Coloma. Andorra has numerous glacial erosional features, including U-shaped valleys, cirques, arêtes, and roche moutonnées. Examples of cirques include the Cirque de Pessons in the east, Llac de Tristaina in the northwest, and the two cirques at approximately 2,400 m (7,900 ft) elevation on Pic de Casamanya (2,740 m (8,990 ft)). Santa Coloma has a glacial terminal moraine.
