= Cerro Aspero Batholith =

Group of plutons in central Argentina

Coordinates: 32°40′00″S 64°00′00″W

Cerro Aspero Batholith (Spanish: batolito de Cerro Aspero) is a group of plutons in southern Sierras Pampeanas in central Argentina. The batholith covers an approximate area of 440 km^{2} and lies about 50 km south of the larger Achala Batholith. The batholith contains various circular plutons emplaced by stoping at pressures of 2 kbar or less. Alpa Corral, El Talita and Los Cerros are the three largest individual plutons and together they make up the bulk of the batholith. The most common rock type is monzogranite with biotite and an igneous texture that is equigranular but varies from coarse grained to porphyritic.

The emplacement of plutons occurred in the Middle to Late Devonian period. Contact aureoles for the batholith are, contrary to other batholiths, largely undeformed. The relation of the magmatic episode represented by the Cerro Aspero Batholith to the Famatinian orogeny is not fully understood. Alternatively it is grouped as a "Achaliano" igneous cycle.

Vertical to near-vertical veins of fluorite formed in the Cretaceous occur in the batholith. At most veins reach 3 meters in thickness. Collectively these veins constitute the largest reserves of fluorite in the whole Sierras Pampeanas area.
