= Southeast Asian tin belt =

Mineral-rich region in Southeast Asia

The Southeast Asian tin belt is a mineral-rich region in Southeast Asia that runs from Myanmar, through Thailand, peninsular Malaysia ending at the Bangka Belitung Islands ("Tin Islands") in Indonesia. The belt spans a length of 2800 km and is approximately 400 km wide. It is geologically associated with a series of granitoid intrusions following the same trend as the tin belt. The particular intrusions that are associated to tin mineralizations tend to have high contents of the following elements relative to other intrusions: silica, potassium, uranium, rubidium and thorium. Similarly, tin-associated granitoids tend to be peraluminous. (Note: Peraluminous rocks are those igneous rocks that have ratios of alumina to the sum of potassium, sodium and calcium (A/KNC) higher than 1. In the Southeast Asian tin belt peraluminous rocks and near-peraluminous rocks have A/KNC ratios between 0.98 and 1.17.) From the age of associated grantioids it is inferred that the mineralization occurred in different phases from the late Permian (263 mllions years ago, mya) to the early Miocene (22 mya). Besides tin the belt is also rich in tungsten. In 1995 mines in the tin belt produced about 54% of the world's tin. Most tin and tungsten ores occur in simple veins of hydrothermal origin, but some ores appear in more complex vein patterns such as sheeted veins or stockworks.

== See also ==
- Bolivian tin belt
- Tin mining in Indonesia
- S-type granite
