= Geology of Sierra Leone =

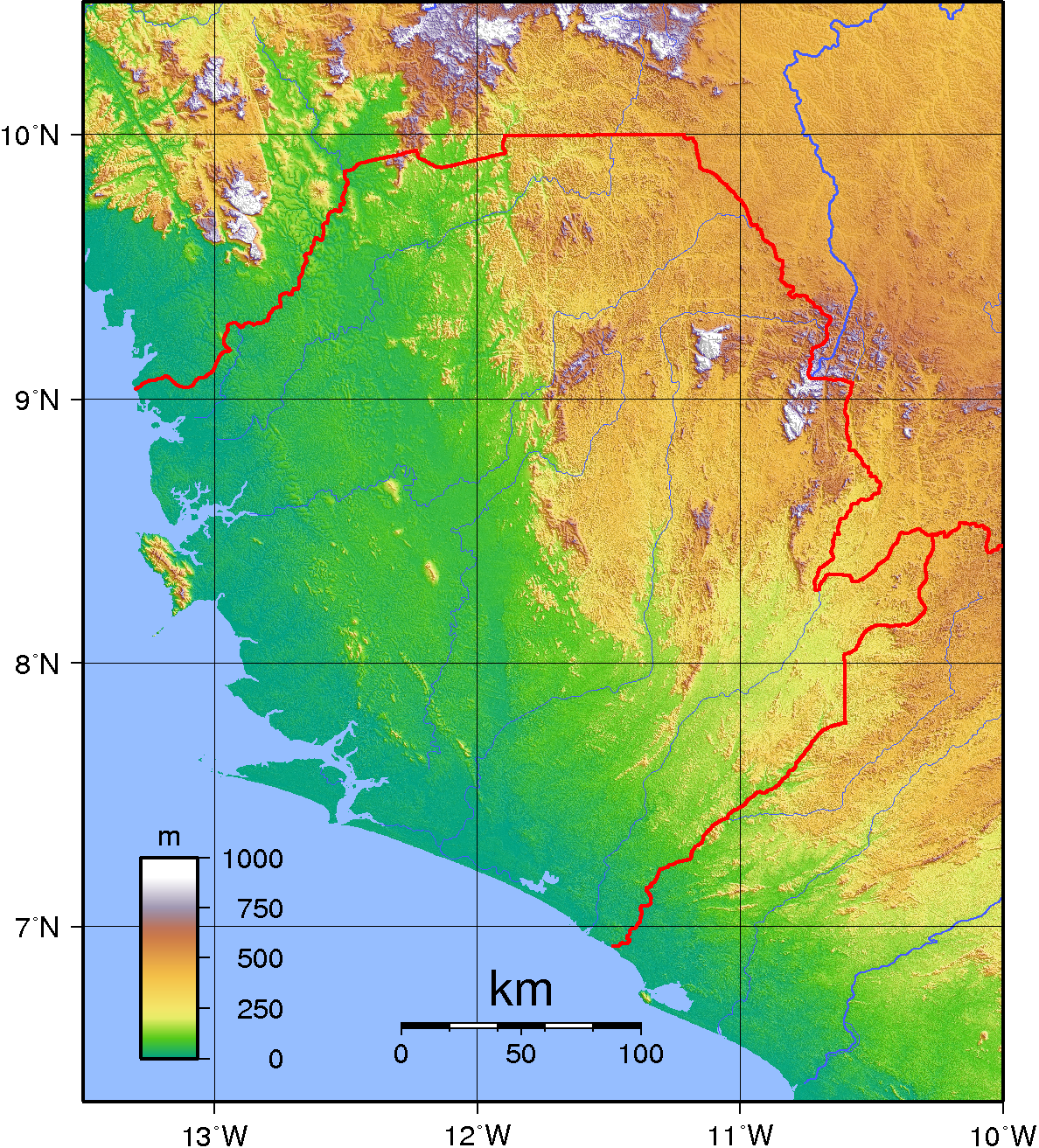
Topography of Sierra Leone

The geology of Sierra Leone is primarily very ancient Precambrian Archean and Proterozoic crystalline igneous and metamorphic basement rock, in many cases more than 2.5 billion years old. Throughout Earth history, Sierra Leone was impacted by major tectonic and climatic events, such as the Leonean, Liberian and Pan-African orogeny mountain building events, the Neoproterozoic Snowball Earth and millions of years of weathering, which has produced thick layers of regolith across much of the country's surface.

== Stratigraphy and geologic history ==
Eastern Sierra Leone is predominantly ancient Archean crystalline basement rocks, more than 2.5 billion years old, belonging to the Kenema-Man shield. The shield region outcrops elsewhere in the wider West African region, in Guinea, Liberia and Ivory Coast. Within the Kenema-Man domain, supracrustal rocks form syncline greenstone belts, surrounded by granite-gneiss and granitoid autochthon areas. In the west of the country, greenstone belts reach up to 130 kilometers long, with thick successions up to 6.5 kilometers, metamorphosed to amphibolite grade metamorphic facies. The country's greenstone belts have a smaller representation of banded iron formations than in many other regions.

Greenstone belt schists form shorter, 40 kilometer belts, in the southeast with varying degrees of metamorphism ranging from greenschist to granulite facies. Central Sierra Leone has Kenema Assemblage granites and acid gneiss, rocks metamorphosed to granulite grade, schist sediments and volcanic fragments. Geologists subdivide the Kenema Assemblage into the older Loko Group, with amphibolite, serpentinite, quartzite and banded iron formations, and the younger Kambui Supergroup, with amphibolitic and ultrabasic volcanic rocks. The Loko Group was deformed by the Leonean orogeny tectonothermal event, 2.96 billion years ago. By contrast, the younger Kambui Supergroup—and its top units of tuff, psammite, pelite and banded iron formations was deformed along an east-west axis during the Leonean orogeny.

The subsequent Liberian orogeny, 2.75 billion years ago, deformed the rocks again, along a new north-south axis.

=== Proterozoic (2.5 billion-539 million years ago) ===
In the Neoproterozoic period of the Proterozoic, 550 million years ago, Sierra Leone was affected the Pan-African orogeny, locally termed by Rokelide Orogen. The orogenic belt extends for 600 kilometers between coastal Guinea and Sierra Leone to Liberia. The Kasila Group is made up of high-grade supracrustal rocks that formed in the Archean and were heavily reworked during the Pan-African orogeny. Kasila Group rocks include charnockite, garnet-hornblende gneiss, garnet and plagioclase gneiss and acid gneiss, metamorphosed to granulite facies. The formation also has local occurrences of pyroxenite and hornblendite.

Further east, the recumbent folds of the Marampa Group overly granites and may contact the Rokel River Group at a fault. The Marampa Group formed 2.1 billion years ago, in the early Proterozoic and deformed 560 million years ago at the beginning of the Pan-African orogeny. The group includes ironstone, volcanic sediments and both mafic and felsic volcanic rocks.

The Rokel River Group is the eastern end of the Rokelide belt and includes nine different members and formations, spanning a width of 30 kilometers and a length of 225 kilometers. The rocks in the Rokel River Group include extensive sequences of marl, quartzite, volcanic rocks and sandstone. Although dating of the group remains uncertain, the bottom units are rocks formed from glacial sediments that correlate with other late Neoproterozoic Snowball Earth glacial deposits throughout West Africa.

== Tectonics ==
In terms of geologic structure, Sierra Leone can be subdivided into two major groups. The eastern unit is part of the West African Craton and has a northeast-southwest foliation, that extends into the interior. The western structural unit encompasses the coastal areas and is oblique to the grain of the central highlands.

== Hydrogeology ==
Unconsolidated alluvial deposits up to 15 meters thick overly many areas of basement rock in Sierra Leone. Along the coast is the Bullom Group, a belt of unconsolidated sands and gravels 10 to 20 meters thick, overlying sands and clays 30 to 80 meters thick. The formation is a moderately productive aquifer. The Saionya Scarp and Rokel River Group form a consolidated, near-surface weathered regolith aquifer in metasedimentary rocks, with low intergranular porosity. Where groundwater does exist in these groups, it aggregates along fractures, formed by old bedding plains.

Much of Sierra Leone's territory is underlain by weathered bedrock regolith. There is very little clay in the 20 meter thick weathered section, which is mostly metal oxides, although the lowest layers near the intact, unweathered basement rock tends to high concentrations of clay. Fractures in the unweathered rock store and transmit groundwater.

== Natural resource geology ==
Sierra Leone has extensive natural resources and mining of rutile, ilmenite, diamonds, bauxite and gold played an important role in the economy prior to the civil war.
