= Batholith =

Large igneous rock intrusion

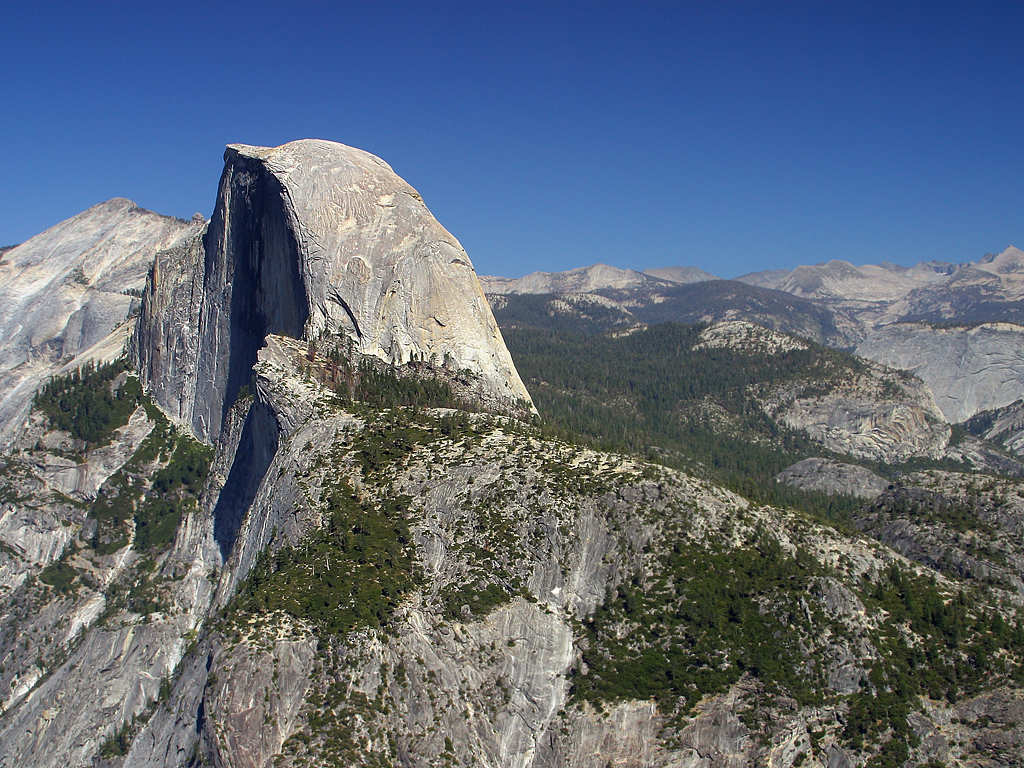
Half Dome, a quartz monzonite monolith in Yosemite National Park and part of the Sierra Nevada Batholith

A batholith (from Ancient Greek βαθύς (bathús), meaning "deep", and λίθος (líthos), meaning "stone") is a large mass of intrusive igneous rock (also called plutonic rock), larger than 100 km^{2} (40 sq mi) in area, that forms from cooled magma deep in the Earth's crust. Batholiths are almost always made mostly of felsic or intermediate rock types, such as granite, quartz monzonite, or diorite (see also granite dome).

Basic types of igneous intrusions: 1. Laccolith; 2. Small dike; 3. Batholith; 4. Dike; 5. Sill; 6. Volcanic neck and pipe; 7. Lopolith; Note: As a general rule, in contrast to the active volcanic vent in the figure, these names refer to the fully cooled and usually millions-of-years-old rock formations, which are the result of the underground magmatic activity shown.

== Formation ==
Although they may appear uniform, batholiths are in fact structures with complex histories and compositions. They are composed of multiple masses, or plutons, bodies of igneous rock of irregular dimensions (typically at least several kilometers) that can be distinguished from adjacent igneous rock by some combination of criteria including age, composition, texture, or mappable structures. Individual plutons are solidified from magma that traveled toward the surface from a zone of partial melting near the base of the Earth's crust.

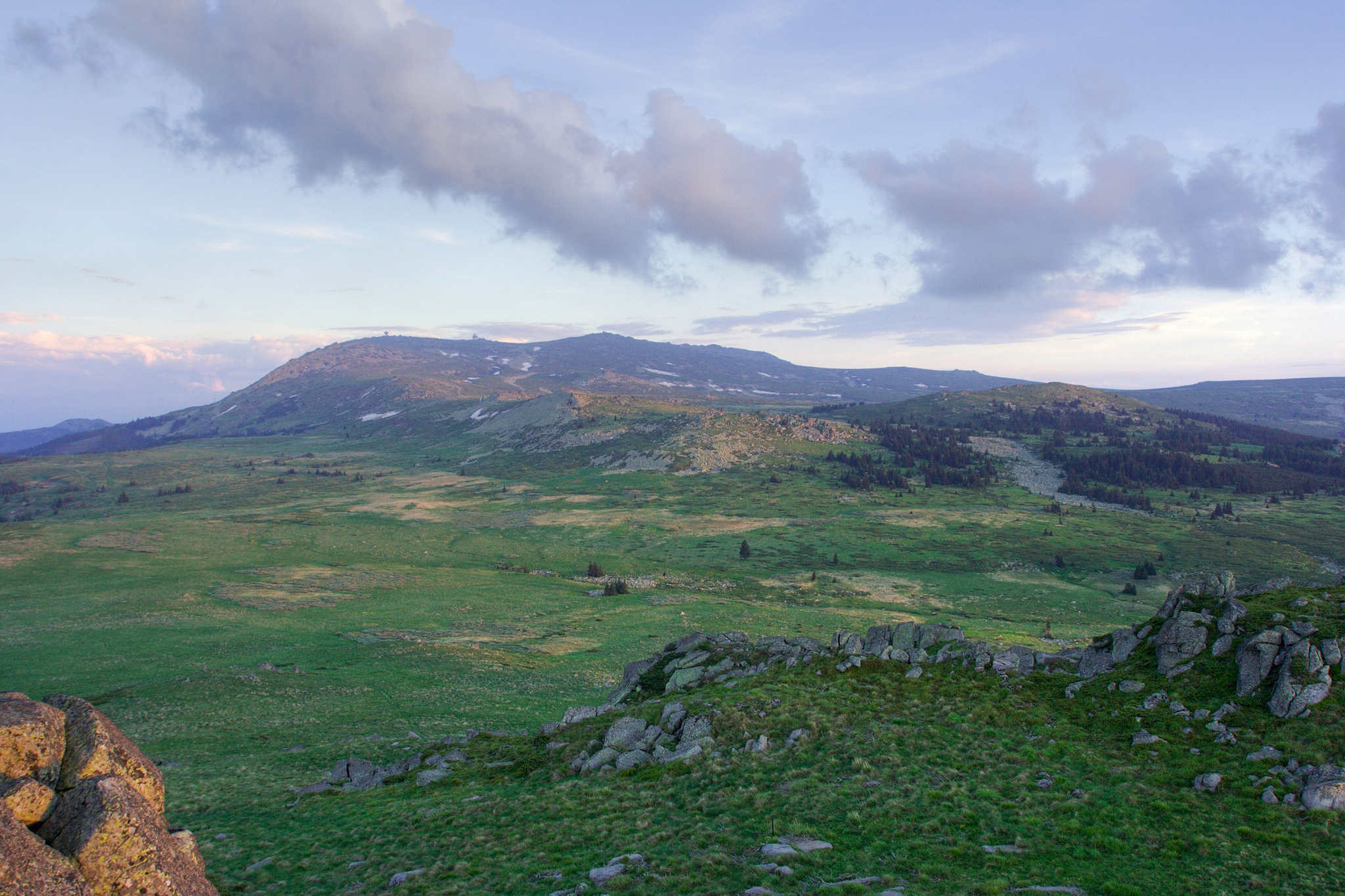
The eroded laccolith above the batholith system of Vitosha, the Plana domed mountains, next to Sofia, Bulgaria

Traditionally, these plutons have been considered to form by ascent of relatively buoyant magma in large masses called plutonic diapirs. Because the diapirs are liquified and very hot, they tend to rise through the surrounding native country rock, pushing it aside and partially melting it. Most diapirs do not reach the surface to form volcanoes, but instead they slow down, cool, and usually solidify 5 to 30 kilometers underground as plutons (hence the use of the word pluton; in reference to the Roman god of the underworld Pluto). An alternate view is that plutons are formed by aggregation of smaller volumes of magma that ascend as dikes.

A batholith is formed when many plutons converge to form a huge expanse of granitic rock. Some batholiths are mammoth, paralleling past and present subduction zones and other heat sources for hundreds of kilometers in continental crust. One such batholith is the Sierra Nevada Batholith, which is a continuous granitic formation that makes up much of the Sierra Nevada in California. An even larger batholith, the Coast Plutonic Complex, is found predominantly in the Coast Mountains of western Canada; it extends for 1,800 kilometers and reaches into southeastern Alaska.

== Surface expression and erosion ==
A batholith is an exposed area of (mostly) continuous plutonic rock that covers an area larger than 100 square kilometers (40 square miles). Areas smaller than 100 square kilometers are called stocks. However, the majority of batholiths visible at the surface (via outcroppings) have areas far greater than 100 square kilometers. These areas are exposed to the surface through the process of erosion accelerated by continental uplift acting over many tens of millions to hundreds of millions of years. This process has removed several tens of square kilometers of overlying rock in many areas, exposing the once deeply buried batholiths.

Batholiths exposed at the surface are subjected to huge pressure differences between their former location deep in the earth and their new location at or near the surface. As a result, their crystal structure expands slightly over time. This manifests itself by a form of mass wasting called exfoliation. This form of weathering causes convex and relatively thin sheets of rock to slough off the exposed surfaces of batholiths (a process accelerated by frost wedging). The result is fairly clean and rounded rock faces. A well-known result of this process is Half Dome in Yosemite Valley.

== Examples ==
=== Africa ===
- Aswan Granite Batholith
- Cape Coast Batholith, Ghana
- Heerenveen Batholith, South Africa
- Paarl Rock, South Africa
- Darling Batholith, South Africa
- Hook granite massif, Zambia
- Mubende Batholith, Uganda

=== Antarctica ===
- Antarctic Peninsula Batholith
- Queen Maud Batholith

=== Asia ===
- Angara-Vitim batholith, Siberia
- Bhongir Fort Batholith, Telangana, India
- Chibagalakh batholith, Siberia
- Mount Abu, India
- Gangdese batholith, Himalaya
- Trans-Himalayan Batholith, Himalaya
- Kalba-Narym batholith, Kazakhstan
- Karakorum Batholith, Himalaya
- Tak batholith, Thailand
- Tien Shan batholith, Central Asia
- Ranchi batholith, India

=== Europe ===
- La Pedriza, Spain.
- Bindal Batholith, Norway
- Cornubian batholith, England
- Corsica-Sardinia Batholith
- Donegal batholith, Ireland
- Leinster Batholith, Ireland
- Mancellian batholith, France
- North Pennine Batholith, England
- Ljusdal Batholith, Sweden
- Mt-Louis-Andorra Batholith
- Riga Batholith, Latvia
- Salmi Batholith, Republic of Karelia, Russia
- Sunnhordaland Batholith, Norway
- Transscandinavian Igneous Belt, Sweden and Norway

- Revsund Massif
- Rätan Batholith
- Småland–Värmland Belt

- Vitosha (mountain massif) and Plana (mountain), Sofia, Bulgaria

=== North America ===
- Bald Rock Batholith
- Enchanted Rock, Texas
- Boulder Batholith
- British Virgin Islands, Virgin Gorda
- Chambers-Strathy Batholith
- Chilliwack batholith
- Golden Horn Batholith
- Idaho Batholith
- Ilimaussaq Batholith, Greenland
- Kenosha Batholith
- Mount Stuart Batholith, Washington
- Wallowa Batholith, Oregon
- Peninsular Ranges, Baja and Southern California
- Pike's Peak Granite Batholith
- Ruby Mountains
- Rio Verde Batholith, Mexico
- San Lorenzo Batholith, Puerto Rico
- Sierra Nevada Batholith
- South Mountain Batholith, Nova Scotia
- Town Mountain Granite batholith, Texas
- Wyoming batholith

=== Oceania ===
- Cullen Batholith, Australia
- Kosciuszko Batholith, Australia
- Moruya Batholith, Australia
- Scottsdale Batholith, Australia
- Median Batholith, New Zealand
- New England Batholith, Australia

=== South America ===
- Achala Batholith, Argentina
- Antioquia Batholith, Colombia
- Guanambi Batholith, Bahia, Brazil
- Parguaza rapakivi granite Batholith, Venezuela and Colombia
- Cerro Aspero Batholith, Argentina
- Coastal Batholith of Peru
- Colangüil Batholith, Argentina
- Cordillera Blanca Batholith, Peru
- Vicuña Mackenna Batholith, Chile
- Elqui-Limarí Batholith, Chile and Argentina
- Futrono-Riñihue Batholith, Chile
- Illescas Batholith, Uruguay
- Coastal Batholith of central Chile
- Panguipulli Batholith, Chile
- Patagonian Batholith, Chile and Argentina
  - North Patagonian Batholith
  - South Patagonian Batholith

== See also ==
- Laccolith
- Sill
- Volcanic plug
