= Angara-Vitim batholith =

The Angara-Vitim batholith is group of plutons in the eastern Siberia, just east of Lake Baikal. The batholith formed in the Devonian–Early Carboniferous likely in connection to a mantle plume. It formed about the same time and by the same process as the Kalba-Narym batholith in eastern Kazakhstan.

Common rock types are granite with biotite and granodiorite. The rocks belong to the high-K and shoshonite subseries of the calc-alkaline magma series. Some rocks do belong to the alkaline magma series.
