= Panguipulli Batholith =

- Stratigraphic range: Jurassic
- Type: Batholith

Lithology
- Primary: Granite

Location
- Coordinates: 39.6°S 72.25°W
- Region: Los Ríos Region
- Country: Chile

Type section
- Named for: Panguipulli Lake
- Panguipulli Batholith (Chile)

The Panguipulli Batholith is a granitic batholith of Jurassic age located in the Andes around Panguipulli Lake in southern Chile.
