= Wyoming batholith =

Granite batholith in central Wyoming

The Wyoming batholith is a granite batholith of Neoarchean origin 2,800 to 2,500 million years ago—which forms the eroded core of the Granite and Laramie Mountains in central Wyoming. The Wyoming batholith lies within the Wyoming Craton. The batholith, in its time, was a magma chamber. Contemporary magma chambers are filled with lava and buried deeply and are inaccessible. The Wyoming batholith is accessible for study, its overburden having eroded away.
