= Calcflinta =

Calcflinta, or calc-flinta, is a fine grained calc–silicate rock found amongst the metamorphic rocks of the eastern Highlands of Scotland. It is a hornfels developed from calcareous mudstone. Calcflinta is also found, for example, around the margin of the granites in south west Britain, and on King Island in Tasmania.
