= Futrono-Riñihue Batholith =

Igneous intrusion

- Stratigraphic range: Permian
- Type: Batholith

Lithology
- Primary: Granite, granodiorite

Location
- Coordinates: 40.069223°S 72.240880°W
- Region: Los Ríos Region
- Country: Chile
- Futrono-Riñihue Batholith (Chile)

The Futrono-Riñihue Batholith (Spanish: Batolito Futrono-Riñihue) is a group of plutons in the Andes of Los Ríos Region, southern Chile. The plutons date to the Permian.
