= Achala Batholith =

Group of plutons in central Argentina

Coordinates: 31°30′00″S 64°45′00″W

The Achala Batholith (Spanish: batolito de Achala) is a group of plutons in the Sierras de Córdoba in central Argentina. With a mapped surface of over 2,500 square kilometres (970 sq mi) it constitutes the largest group of intrusions exposed in the Sierras Pampeanas. The oldest reference to the batholith dates to 1932.

== Host rock and structural setting ==
Plutons intrude into older migmatites, metamorphic rocks of sedimentary and volcanic protoliths. Some specific intruded rock types are: biotite-bearing tonalitic gneisses, amphibolite, marble and quartzite.

In the large-scale the intrusion is parallel to the schistosity of the older rocks. However, at smaller scales, the intrusion seems to disregard schistisity. Host rocks are altered contact metamorphism and associated fluids. Alteration is seen in the occurrence of marble and minerals such as vesuvianite and humite, both of which are high on fluorine. This alteration is thought to also have affected the batholith itself.

== Lithology and alteration ==
Most rocks of the batholith are monzogranites but granodiorites and tonalites do also occur. The central parts of the batholith are fully granitic and include leucogranite. Grain size vary from coarse to fine and at places the rocks are porphyritic. Dykes of lamprophyre and nephelinite that occur in the region are associated with the batholith.

Pegmatites and aplites, albeit not voluminous, are recurrent in the batholith. The pegmatite of Las Tapias in the southwestern part of the batholith makes up Argentina's "most important" beryllium deposit. Other pegmatites of the batholith have been mined for quartz, feldspar and beryl plus lesser amounts of columbite and tantalite. More important deposits is the tungsten that can be obtained from skarns with scheelite and wolframite-bearing quartz veins. Skarns are associated to marble and amphibolite host rock.

The whole batholith has been subject to deuteric alteration that replaced rock's biotite with muscovite and in general depleted biotite in iron, magnesium and titanium. Plagioclases have been affected to a much lesser degree by alteration having have slight compositional changes along the crystal rims or limited transformation into muscovite. This alteration has also led to an overall loss of alcalis (potassium, sodium) from the rock. A number of fractures of the batholith show greisen alteration with quartz, sericite, fluorite and tourmaline. No metallic deposits are known from these greisens.

The Achala Batholit contains unusual enclaves of biotite and apatite that form layers in the intrusion.

== Origins of magmas ==
The batholith plutons intruded and cooled 370 million years ago in the Devonian Period.

Geochemical characteristics indicate the granites are A-type granites and peraluminous (aluminous A-type). These characteristics are interpreted to reflect a mixed origin for the magmas with sources both in the mantle and in the crust. Crustal sources would have contributed to the magmas by melting under anhydrous conditions, with such conditions being allowed by a large undetermined heat source. The magma formed and cooled in the aftermath of an orogeny and qualify thus the group of post-orogenic intrusions.

Four igneous suites of rocks with geochemical affinities make up the batholith, these are the Achala, El Condor, Champaqui, Characato and Cumbresita suites. The Achala suite has by far the largest extent making up c. 70% of the surface area of the batholith. The five suites represents different magmatic episodes. Suites differ in associated metals as well as biotite chemistry. Chemical variations along each suite are concordant with the fractional crystallization model of igneous differentiation.
