= Ljusdal Batholith =

The Ljusdal Batholith is a group of plutons in central Sweden formed during the Svecofennian orogeny. The batholith occupies a NW-SE elongated area of c. 130 x 100 km covering most of Hälsingland. The Ljusdal Bathoilith is mostly made up of granitoids with lesser amounts of mafic intrusions.

The plutons of the batholith crystallized from magma 1840 to 1860 million years ago in Paleoproterozoic times at an ancient convergent boundary.
