= Donegal batholith =

The Donegal batholith is a large granitic igneous intrusion of early Devonian age that outcrops in County Donegal in Ireland. It consists of at least eight separate plutons, the largest of which is the Main Donegal Granite. It was intruded at a late stage in the Caledonian orogeny about 400 million years ago (Ma).

== Extent and geometry ==
The Donegal batholith extends for about 75 km in a SW-NE direction from just west of the small town of Ardara to Fanad Head. The NW-SE extent is more difficult to determine as much of the Thorr and Fanad plutons lie offshore.

== Formation ==
The Donegal batholith was formed during the Early Devonian, towards the end of the Caledonian orogeny between about 418 and 397 Ma. It is interpreted to have been intruded along a major SW-NE trending sinistral shear zone. The space to allow the intrusion of such large volumes of granitic magma into the crust is thought to be a result of movement along the shear zone combined with the sinistral strike-slip reactivation of a major SSW-NNE trending fault, running approximately through the centres of the Ardara, Trawenagh Bay, Rosses and Thorr plutons.

The chemistry and timing of the granites does not suggest that they are subduction-related. Subduction is thought to have ceased by the end of the Silurian (~419 Ma) and there is no evidence of significant involvement of mid-ocean ridge basalt or asthenosphere sources for the granitic melts. Break-off of the subducting slab following the end of subduction would lead to the upwelling of hot asthenosphere, causing melting of the overlying lithosphere producing lamprophyric magmas, underplating and injecting into the crust. The granitic magmas may be a result of either partially melting the lamprophyric underplate or by differentiation from the lamprophyric magmas. Further upwelling would lead to an increase degree of melting within the crust, contributing to a decrease in the amount of mantle component in the granitic melts. This is consistent with an overall change from more basic to more acidic with time observed in the plutons and a reduction of Barium and Strontium.

== Plutons ==
The batholith is made of at least eight separate granitic plutons.

=== Main Donegal Granite ===
This is the largest of the plutons, extending for 44 km and about 10 km across. Three main phases of intrusion are evident. The first phase is a fine-grained granodiorite, which was emplaced into the Dalradian country rock, followed by sheeted tonalites intruded into both the Dalradian and the granodiorite. These early phases were followed by the emplacement of a large volume of porphyritic monzogranites at a time when the granodiorite and tonalite had cooled sufficiently to fracture.

=== Trawenagh Bay ===
This pluton lies at the southwestern end of the Main Donegal granite. Three distinct types of granite are recognised, an outer biotite monzogranite inside which there is a body of biotite-muscovite monzogranite and in the centre is an aplitic biotite-muscovite microgranite. The intrusion is interpreted to have the form of a laccolith. The main part of the pluton shows only weak evidence of deformation. Studies of the anisotropy of the magnetic susceptibility (AMS) have found evidence of consistent west-east linear fabrics, interpreted to result from westward flow of the magma into the Trawenagh Bay pluton from the Main Donegal granite.

=== Thorr ===
The Thorr pluton is one of the largest bodies in the batholith, covering an area of about 800 km^{2}, although its precise extent is unknown as a major part of it lies offshore.

=== Ardara ===
The Ardara pluton has an almost circular outcrop apart from being elongated to towards the east. Most of the outer parts of the intrusion are made of a coarse-grained monzodiorite. Going into the centre of the pluton the next unit is a tonalite-granodiorite, with megacrysts. The central part is a coarse-grained granodiorite.

=== Rosses ===
The roughly circular Rosses pluton also has a concentric plan with an outer unit of medium-grained granite. Inwards this is followed over most of the outcrop by a coarser-grained granite, although it is not present to the south. Occupying most of the centre of the intrusion is a finer-grained granite, locally with the development of a small body of muscovite-rich granite.

=== Barnesmore ===
This pluton lies well to the south of other parts of the batholith and is not that well studied, partly due to a lack of exposure. Three main units have been identified, one of granodiorite and two of granite. The Barnesmore pluton is relatively enriched in Uranium and Thorium compared to other parts of the batholith. Locally the original biotite monzogranite is strongly altered to a rock with a syenite mineralogy, lacking in quartz, due to metasomatism. The intrusion has been dated as 397±7 Ma using Rb-Sr dating.

=== Fanad ===
The Fanad pluton is made up of three separate bodies, with a significant part of its extent being offshore. The main rock types are quartz monzodiorite and granodiorite. The intrusion has been dated as 402±10 Ma using Rb-Sr dating.

=== Toories ===
This pluton is only known from a few exposures of quartz monzodiorite and monzotonalite on islands off the Donegal coast and has been little studied. No radiometric dating has been carried out on this granite, although field relationships suggest that it postdates the Thorr pluton and was intruded before the Rosses pluton. It appears to have a similar internal structure to the Ardara pluton, suggesting it is another example of forceful intrusion.
