= Leaverite =

Rock in the field that looks interesting but is actually not

Leaverite is a slang term used by geologists, mineralogists, archaeologists, and amateur rock collectors to identify a specimen in the field that may look interesting or valuable but not worth removing. Rocks identified as such are generally left where they were found, as there is not sufficient reason to attempt to remove them. The term leaverite derives from the phrase "leave 'er right there".

There are several kinds of leaverites:

1. Man-made features
2. Unrocks; objects that may initially appear to be geologic in origin (also referred to as anthropogenicite).
3. Large fossils and pseudofossils

Additional forms of leaverites include:

1. Specimens that are too large to move or transport
2. Legality of the removal of the specimen is questionable or outright illegal
3. Collection of the specimen may result in death or dismemberment (e.g. the specimen is hanging on the side of a 300 ft cliff, removal of the specimen would result in a boulder falling on the collector, a rattlesnake is sunning itself on the specimen)
4. Asbestos or other minerals with asbestos inclusions
