= Parc Central, Andorra la Vella =

Park in Andorra

Coordinates: 42°30′23″N 1°31′36″E

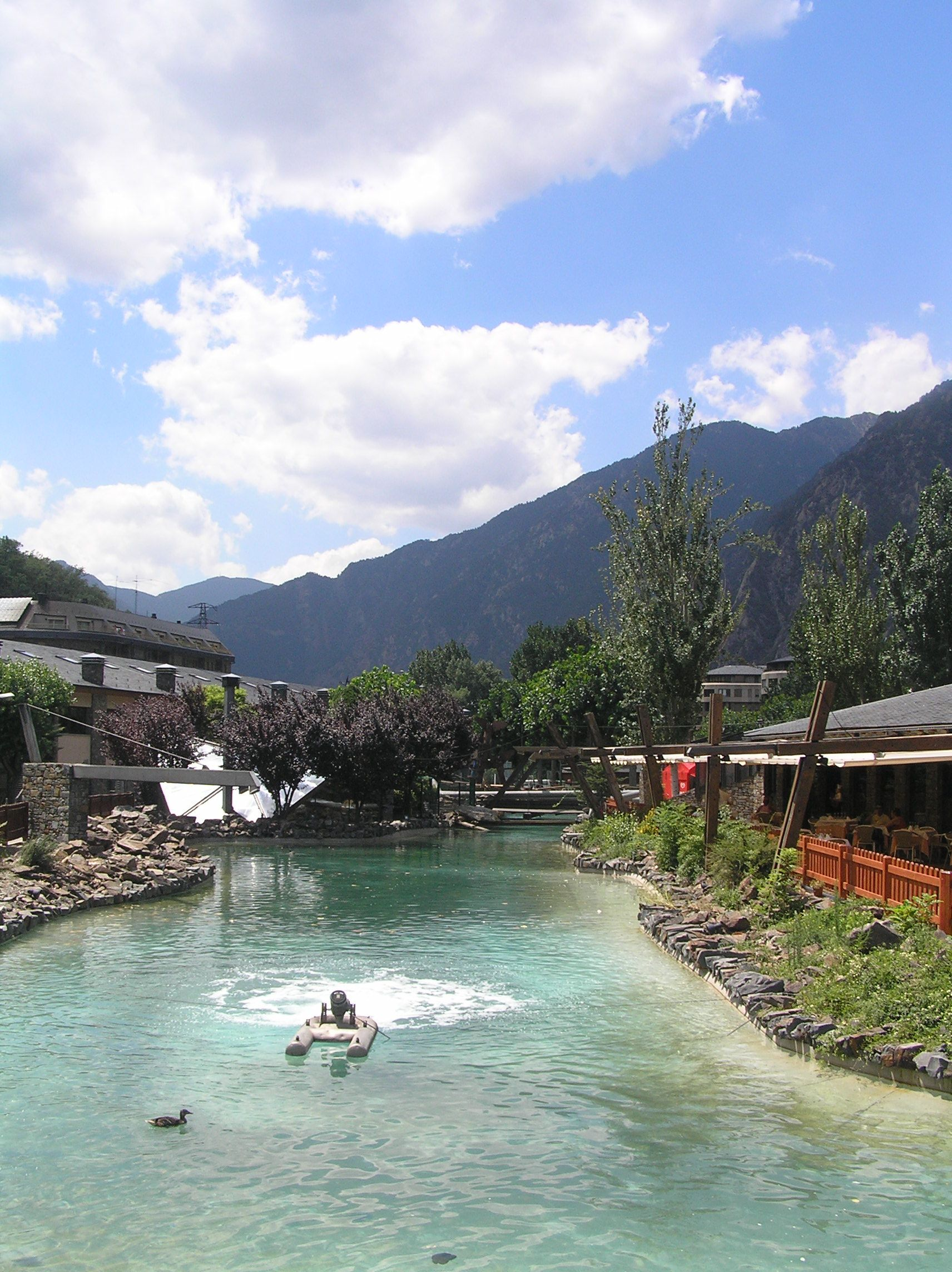
View in Parc Central

Parc Central is a park in Andorra la Vella, Andorra. It was designed by the architect Daniel Gelabert Fontova.
