= Enclave (geology) =

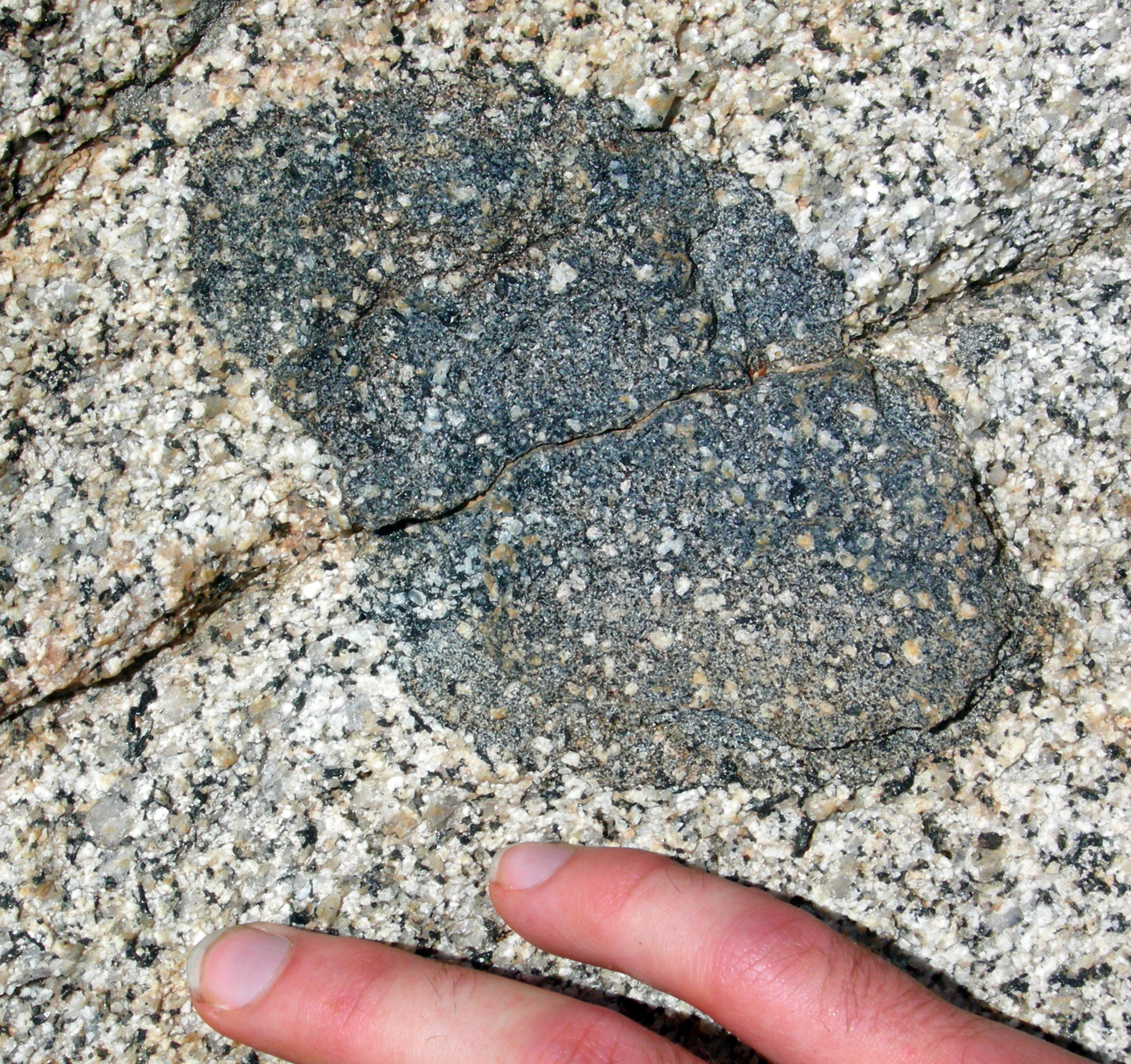
Gabbroic enclave included in a granite

In geology, an enclave is an aggregate of minerals or rock observed inside a larger rock body. Usually it refers to such situations in plutonic rocks. Micro-granular enclaves in felsic plutons result from the introduction of mafic magma into the magma chamber and its subsequent cooling following incomplete mixing.

== See also ==
- Xenolith
