= Calc–silicate rock =

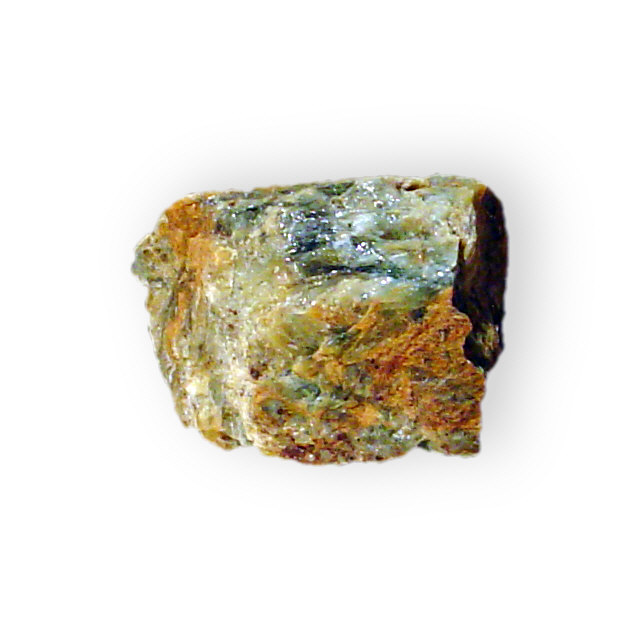
Calc-silicate rock from San Benito County, California

A calc–silicate rock is a rock produced by metasomatic alteration of existing rocks in which calcium silicate minerals, such as diopside and wollastonite, are produced. Calc–silicate skarn or hornfels occur within impure limestone or dolomite strata adjacent to an intruding igneous rock.
