= Kalba-Narym batholith =

The Kalba-Narym batholith or Kalba-Narym granitic batholith is group of plutons and intrusions in the northeastern half of Kazakhstan. The batholith formed in the Early Permian and is part of the Central Asian Orogenic Belt. It formed in connection to the collision of the ancient continents of Siberia and Kazakhstania in the Late Paleozoic. The fact that the batholith is coeval with the basalts of Tarim Basin in China may indicate they are both the result of magma formed by a mantle plume.

Common rock types found in the batholith are granite, granodiorite and leucogranite. The early intrusions of the batholith contain valuable ores as they include pegmatites rich in lithium, tantalum and niobium as well as veins with tin and tungsten minerals.

The Kalba-Narym batholith is made up of the following units:

Batholith units
Kalguty complex	Occur mainly in the southern part of the batholith as intrusive massifs and dykes that trend to the northwest	Garnet and biotite-bearing granodiorite, biotite and hornblende-bearing granodiorite, granite-porphyry granodiorite-porphyry
Kunush complex	Occur as NW-trending dykes all over the batholith and as small plutons in the western and central parts	Plagiogranite-porphyry, granite-porphyry, biotite-bearing plagiogranite, plagiogranodiorite
Kalba complex	Largest unit in the batholith. Form farge plutons with sheet form. Porphyry occur in dykes.	Porphyritic biotite-bearing granodiorite, biotite granite, biotite and muscovite bearing granite, aplite, granitic aplite, granitic pegmatite
Monastyri complex	Crops out chiefly in the southwestern part of the batholith, chain of large plutons.	Granite, biotite and muscovite-bearing granite, aplite, pegmatite.
Kaindy complex	NW-trending chain of concentric intrusions in the southwestern friges of the batholith	Biotite-bearing porphyritic granite, biotite-bearing granite, aplitic granite, aplite-pegmatite
