= Bolivian tin belt =

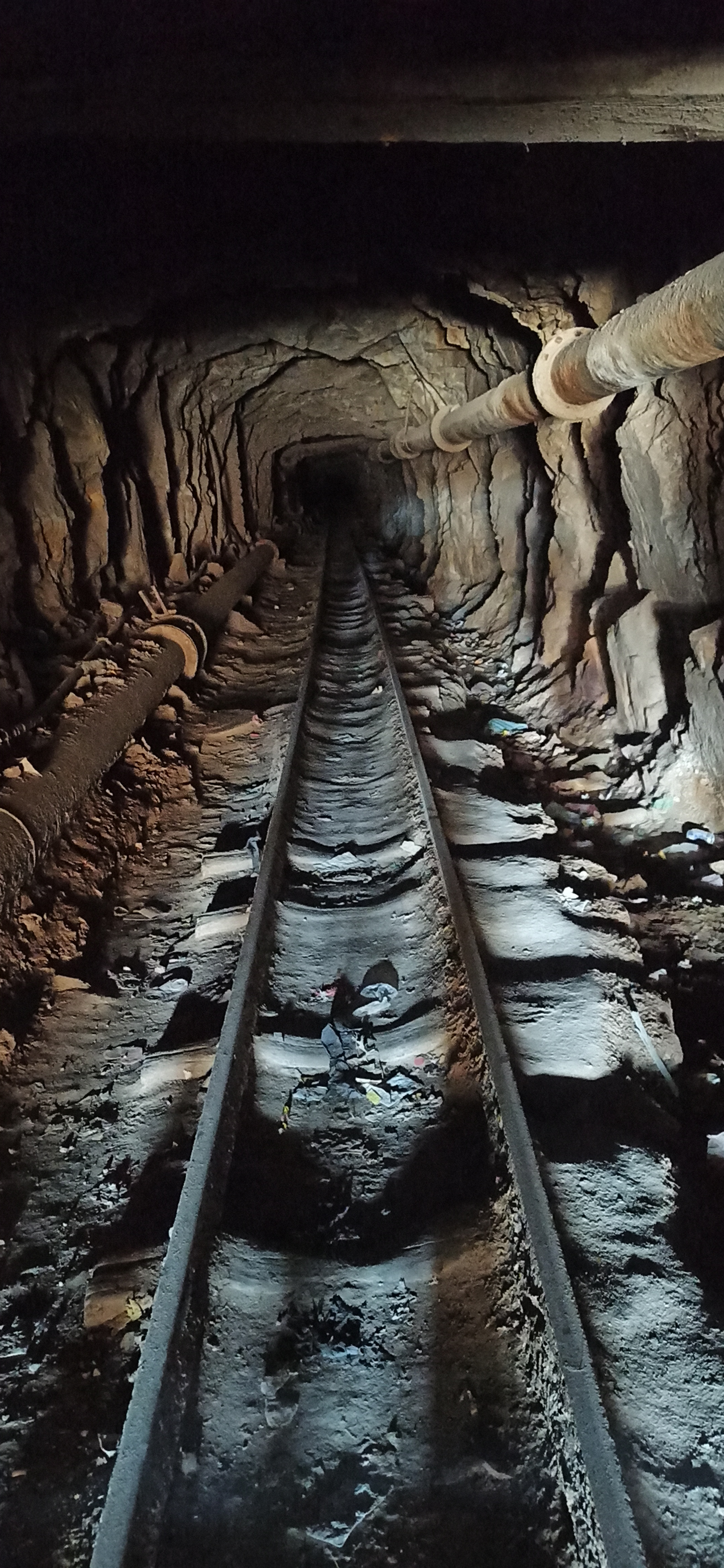
The entrance to the La Salvadora tin mine, Potosí

The Bolivian tin belt (Spanish: Cinturón estanifero boliviano, provincia estannifera boliviana) is a mineral-rich region in the Cordillera Oriental of Bolivia. Being a metallogenetic province the Bolivian tin belt is rich in tin, tungsten, silver and base metals. The Bolivian tin belt follows the same bend as the Bolivian orocline. The mineralizations of the belt were formed episodically beginning in the Triassic and with the youngest known mineralizations dating to the Miocene.

The mineral enrichment is a result of fluids expelled from peraluminous magmas. Peraluminous magmas in turn results from the partial melting (anatexis) of metasedimentary rock and gneiss in the continental crust. Analysis of trace elements in the igneous rocks formed by this magma suggests that some of its material derives from melting of a pelitic rock of Lower Paleozoic age. Besides crustal components magmas did also involve sources in the mantle. The formation of these magmas is thus a form of crustal recycling.

Peraluminous magmas are rare in the Andes but more common in collisional orogens such the Himalayas. From this it is inferred that the Andean orogeny in Bolivia should have features in common with collisional orogens. This in turn might be related to particularities in the interaction of the South American Plate and the Nazca Plate during the Andean orogeny which led to collision-like events in the Cenozoic at the latitudes of Bolivia. The tectonic mechanism makes the invocation of a long-lived "tin anomaly" beneath the Cordillera Oriental unnecessary.

== See also ==
- Cerro Rico of Potosí
- Polymetallic ore
- Potosí Silversmithing School
- Siglo XX mine
- Tin mining in Bolivia
