= Hornblendite =

Plutonic rock consisting mainly of the amphibole hornblende

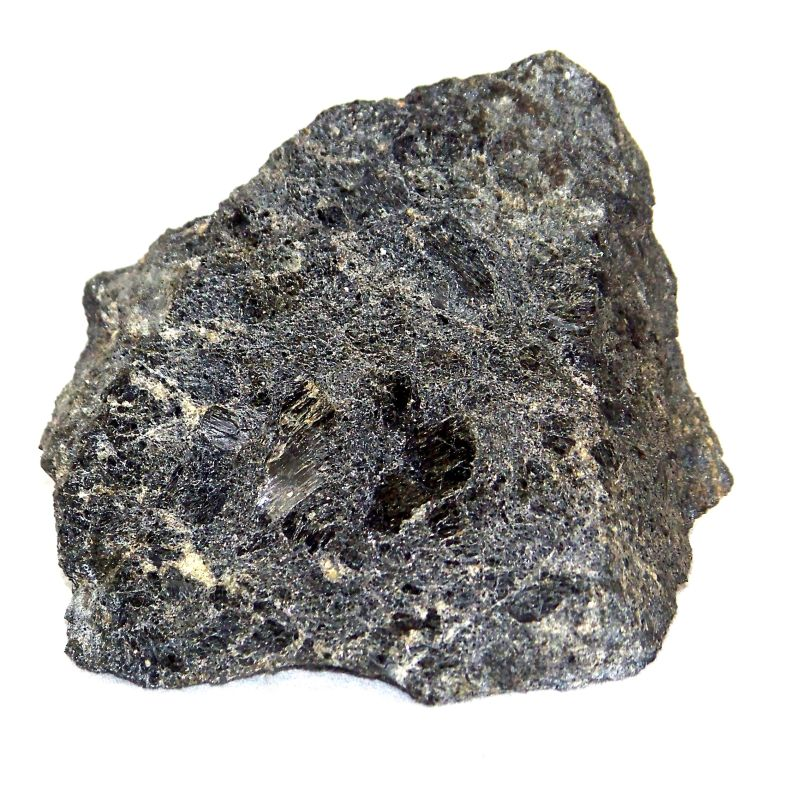
Hornblendite from Poland

Hornblendite is a plutonic rock consisting mainly of the amphibole hornblende. Hornblende-rich ultramafic rocks are rare and when hornblende is the dominant mineral phase they are classified as hornblendites with qualifiers such as garnet hornblendite identifying a second abundant contained mineral.

Metamorphic rocks composed dominantly of amphiboles are referred to as amphibolites.
