= Metaluminous rock =

Type of igneous rock

Chart illustrating the meaning of peralkaline, metaluminous, peraluminous and subaluminous

Metaluminous rocks are igneous rocks that have a molar proportion of aluminium oxide lower than the combination of calcium oxide, sodium oxide and potassium oxide. This contrasts with peraluminous rocks in which the aluminium oxide concentration is higher than the combination, and peralkaline rocks where the alkalis are higher. Most mafic rocks are metaluminous, having neither excess aluminium nor alkalis. In such rocks the alkalis are mostly accommodated in feldspars, and the remaining calcium and minor sodium are found in hornblende and augite.
