= Peraluminous rock =

Chart illustrating the meaning of peralkaline, metaluminous, peraluminous and subaluminous

Peraluminous rocks are igneous rocks that have a molecular proportion of aluminium oxide higher than the combination of sodium oxide, potassium oxide and calcium oxide. This contrasts with peralkaline in which the alkalis are higher, metaluminous where aluminium oxide concentration is lower than the combination, but above the alkalis, and subaluminous in which aluminia concentration is lower than the combination. Examples of peraluminous minerals include biotite, muscovite, cordierite, andalusite and garnet.

Peraluminous corresponds to the aluminum saturation index values greater than 1.

Peraluminous magmas can form S-type granitoids and have been linked to collisional orogenies and to the formation of tin, tungsten and silver deposits such as those in the Bolivian tin belt.
