= Monzogranite =

Biotite granite rocks that are considered to be the final fractionation product of magma

- Igneous rock
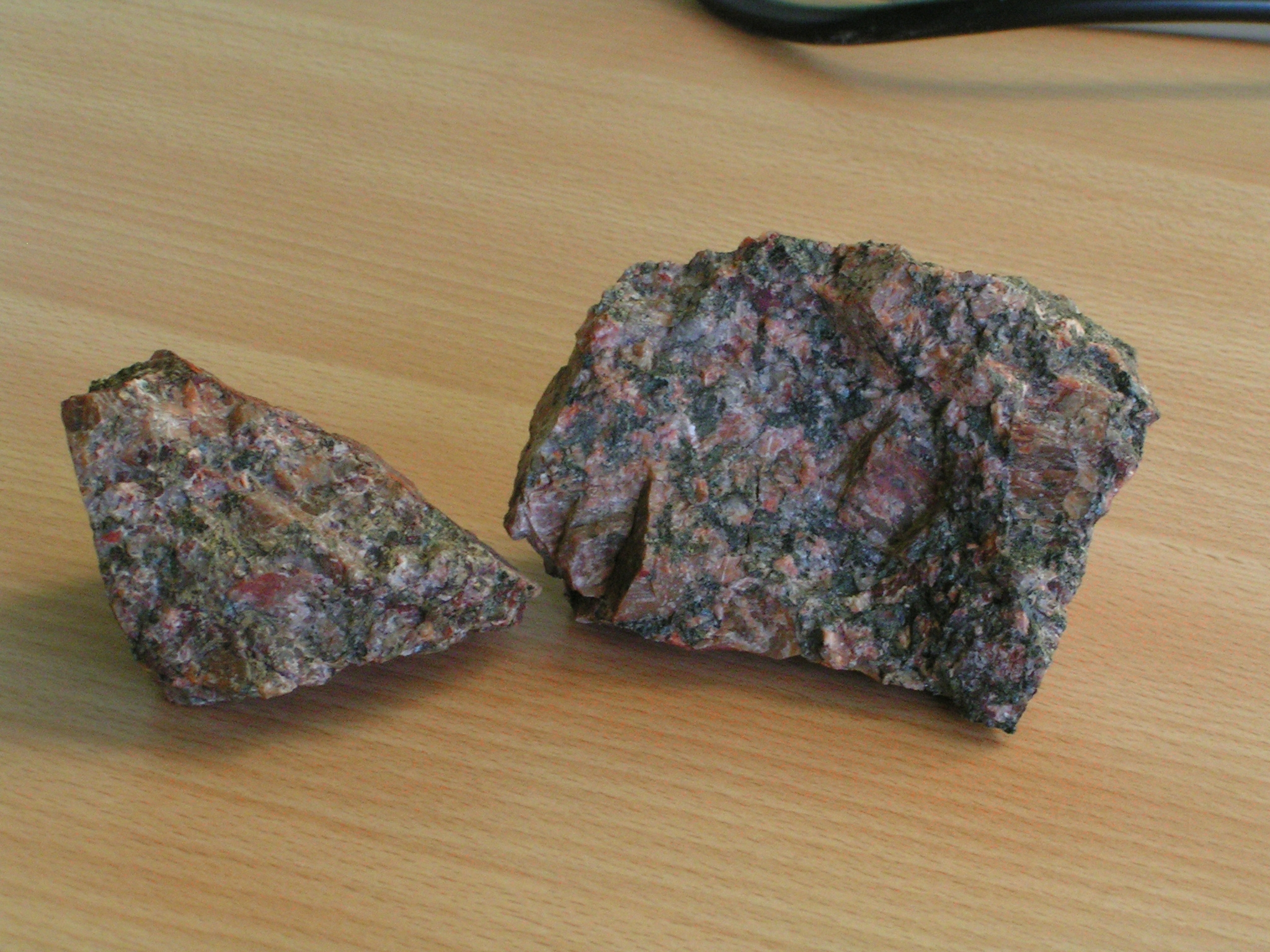
- Monzogranite (Col des Croix, Haute-Saône, France)

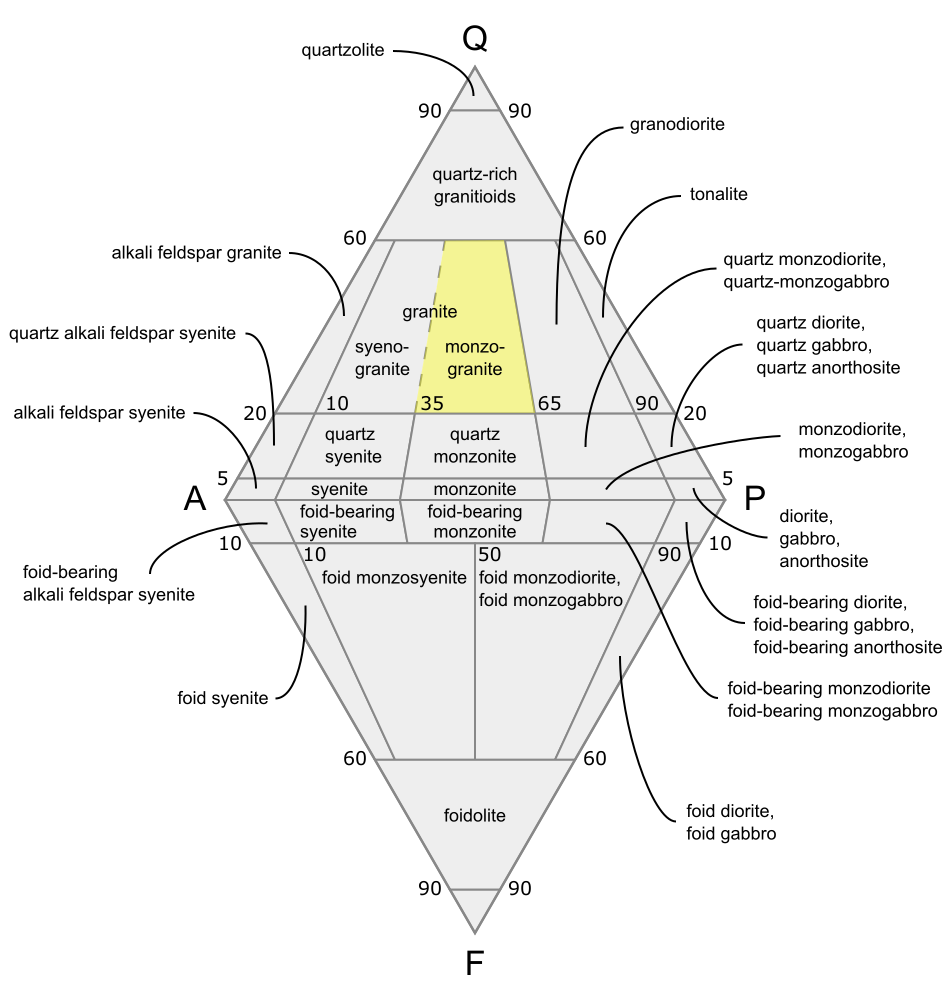
QAPF diagram with the Monzogranite field highlighted

Monzogranite is a plutonic rock that occupies the middle of the QAPF diagram, consisting of between 20–60% quartz, and of the remainder, between 35–65% alkali feldspar and the remainder plagioclase.

== Examples ==
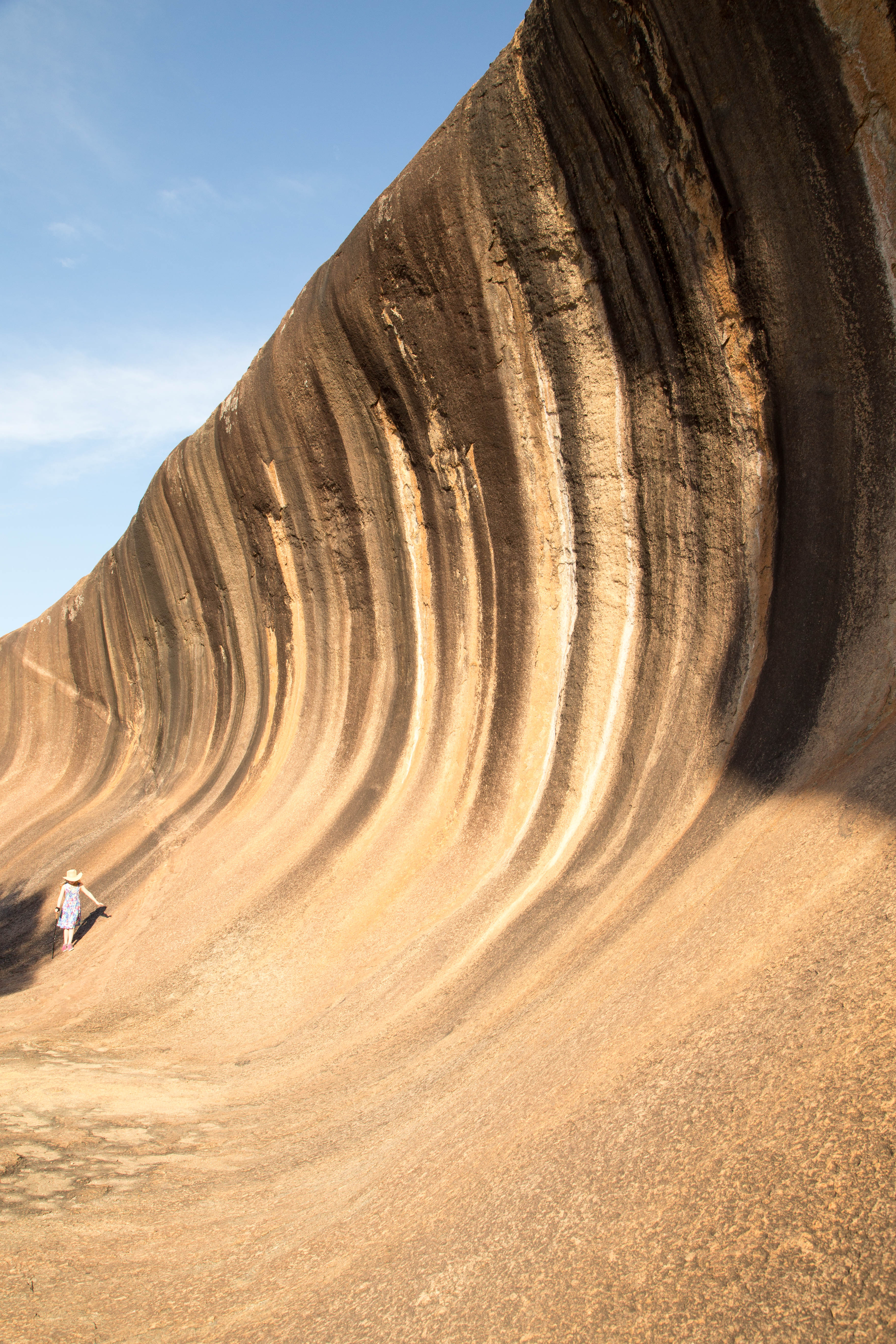
Wave Rock, an outcrop of monzogranite in Western Australia

=== Pilgangoora belt, Pilbara craton, Western Australia ===
Monzogranite is associated with the Pilbara craton, a terrane that collided with Western Australia approximately 3.315 Ga, forming a greenstone belt.

Carlindi monzogranites in the same greenstone belt are primarily equal parts plagioclase and quartz.

=== Quebec's near north ===
In Quebec's near north, early monzogranites are rich in lanthanum, zirconium, but low in ytterbium and yttrium. In general, these monzogranites are low in rare-earth elements.

=== Vigo–Regua shear zone, northern Portugal ===
There are large crystals of potassium feldspar.

=== Gabal El-Urf area, eastern Egypt ===
Granitoids are similar to other granites that were emplaced by crustal extension. The monozogranite is moderately radioactive, with much of the uranium and thorium incorporated into accessory minerals such as zircon, xenotime, and allanite.

=== Southern Variscan belt in southern Europe ===
In the southern Variscan belt, Iberia, the Beiras massif monzogranites are low in aluminum and sodium, while being high in titanium and calcium. The chemistry of these monzogranites could arise from melting of greywacke or tonalite, or basalt that are higher in aluminum.

== See also ==
- List of rock types
- Igneous rocks
