= Andréa Tommasi =

Marine geologist

- Education: Université de Montpellier
- Scientific career
- Workplaces: Geosciences Montpellier; French National Centre for Scientific Research (CNRS)
- Thesis: Développement de systèmes de décrochements d'échelle continentale dans une lithosphère hétérogène : cas naturels et modélisation numérique (1995)

Andréa Tommasi is a geoscientist from Brazil known for her research on geodynamics and terrestrial deformation. She is a recipient of the CNRS silver medal and an elected fellow of the American Geophysical Union.

== Education and career ==
Tommasi earned her Ph.D. from the University of Montpellier in 1995. Following her Ph.D., she was a postdoc at the University of Leeds from 1997 until 1998. In 1998 she joined the faculty of the French National Centre for Scientific Research (CNRS). As of 2020, Tommasi is the research director of the Geosciences Laboratory at the University of Montpellier.

In 2016, Tommasi was elected a fellow of the American Geophysical Union who cited her "for pioneering work on deformation mechanisms and microstructures within the Earth and their impact on plate tectonics".

== Research ==
Tommasi's early research was on deformation of rocks in the Dom Feliciano Belt in Brazil. Her research includes the development of numerical models to study seismic anisotropy and continental rifting. Tommasi's research extends to locations around the globe including Siberia, the Avacha volcano in Kamchatka, Hawaii, and the Southwest Indian Ridge.

Tomassi's research utilizes preferred lattice orientation and seismic property analysis of mineral grains, laboratory deformation experiments, and numerical modeling including viscoplastic self-consistent and equilibrium based models. She also utilizes x-ray fluorescence analysis, electron probe analysis, and field relationships of mantle rock to contribute to scientific understanding of mantle processes and deformation.

== Notable publications ==
Tomassi has collaborated on over 150 articles since 1989, with publications cited more than 9,000 times overall. Her most cited paper is Tomassi et al. (2000), followed by le Roux et al. (2007) and Mainprice et al. (2005).

Tomassi et al. (2000) created models accurately capturing the development of mineral alignment (lattice preferred orientation) of olivine and seismic anisotropy in response to upper mantle plastic flow. The anisotropic viscoplastic self-consistent model had the best correlation to natural and experimental observations of how olivine alignment during deformation affects seismic properties, as S-wave and P-wave propagation prediction errors were less than 15º off. While equilibrium-based models are slightly less accurate, the authors note that they still save a significant amount of computation time. These models describing mineral alignment on the small scale have implications for analyzing geologic deformation on larger scales.

Le Roux et al. (2007) centers around the investigation of the Lherz Massif, a large body of mantle peridotite located in the French Pyrenees. This investigation concerned the history of lherzolite in the Lherz body, which was previously considered to be pristine, minimally altered mantle rock. Le Roux et al. (2007) suggests that much of this lherzolite is not pristine mantle, based on geochemical analysis and structural relationships between the lherzolite and adjacent harzburgite, which is produced by the partial melting of lherzolite. Le Roux et al. (2007) suggests that if the lherzolite is an example of pristine mantle, then it must be older than the adjacent harzburgite. However, based on the cross-cutting relationship of the lherzolite and the harzburgite and a trace element comparison, the lherzolite is revealed to be younger. Thus, this paper argues that lherzolite is not an example of pristine mantle rock. Any research that uses the Lherz massif as a basis for conclusions regarding the mantle are therefore unsupported, and must be called into question.

The findings in Mainprice et al. (2005) challenges previous theories that olivine deforms via dislocation creep at depths above 250 km in the upper mantle, and via diffusion creep at deeper depths. This was believed to explain the presence of seismic anisotropy above 250 km depth, and little anisotropy below this depth. However, experiments performed in this study found that high pressure dislocation creep dominates the upper mantle below 250 km depth, but in a different slip direction, which produces little seismic anisotropy and can explain the observed change in anisotropy with depth.

== Selected publications ==
- Tommasi, Andréa; Mainprice, David; Canova, Gilles; Chastel, Yvan (2000). "Viscoplastic self-consistent and equilibrium-based modeling of olivine lattice preferred orientations: Implications for the upper mantle seismic anisotropy". Journal of Geophysical Research: Solid Earth. 105 (B4): 7893–7908. Bibcode:2000JGR...105.7893T. doi:10.1029/1999JB900411. ISSN 2156-2202.
- Le Roux, V.; Bodinier, J.-L.; Tommasi, A.; Alard, O.; Dautria, J.-M.; Vauchez, A.; Riches, A.J.V. (2007). "The Lherz spinel lherzolite: Refertilized rather than pristine mantle". Earth and Planetary Science Letters. 259 (3–4): 599–612. Bibcode:2007E&PSL.259..599L. doi:10.1016/j.epsl.2007.05.026.
- Mainprice, David; Tommasi, Andréa; Couvy, Hélène; Cordier, Patrick; Frost, Daniel J. (2005). "Pressure sensitivity of olivine slip systems and seismic anisotropy of Earth's upper mantle". Nature. 433 (7027): 731–733. Bibcode:2005Natur.433..731M. doi:10.1038/nature03266. ISSN 0028-0836. PMID 15716950. S2CID 4428125.
- Tommasi, Andréa; Tikoff, Basil; Vauchez, Alain (1999). "Upper mantle tectonics: three-dimensional deformation, olivine crystallographic fabrics and seismic properties". Earth and Planetary Science Letters. 168 (1–2): 173–186. Bibcode:1999E&PSL.168..173T. doi:10.1016/S0012-821X(99)00046-1.
- Tommasi, Andréa; Vauchez, Alain (2001-02-15). "Continental rifting parallel to ancient collisional belts: an effect of the mechanical anisotropy of the lithospheric mantle" (PDF). Earth and Planetary Science Letters. 185 (1–2): 199–210. Bibcode:2001E&PSL.185..199T. doi:10.1016/S0012-821X(00)00350-2. S2CID 54618989.

== Awards and honors ==
- Fellow, American Geophysical Union (2016)
- Recipient of European Research Council grant (2019)
- French National Centre for Scientific Research (CNRS) 2020 silver medal (2020)
