= Geology of Uzbekistan =

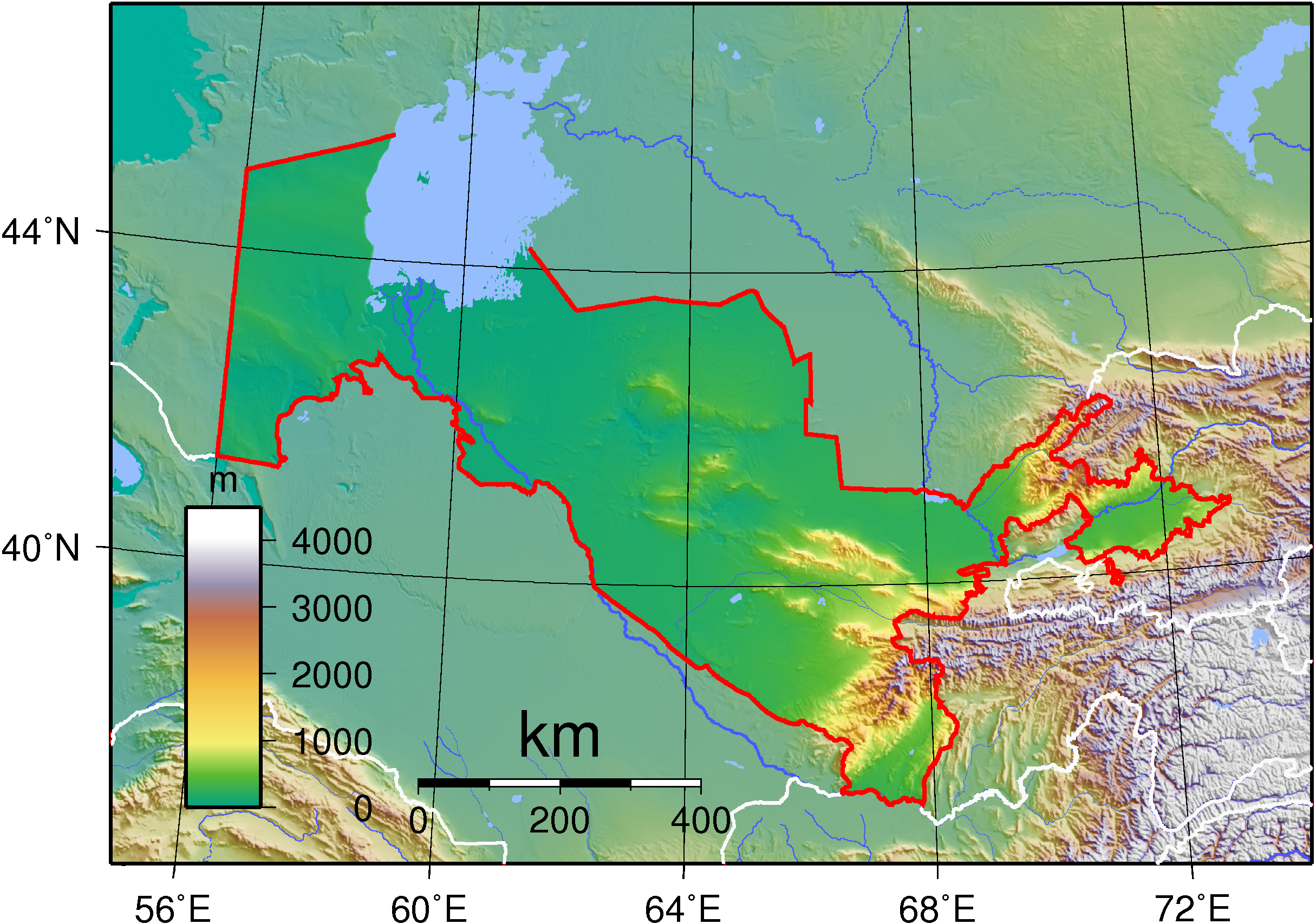
Topographic map of Uzbekistan

The geology of Uzbekistan consists of two microcontinents and the remnants of oceanic crust, which fused together into a tectonically complex but resource rich land mass during the Paleozoic, before becoming draped in thick, primarily marine sedimentary units.

== Geologic history, stratigraphy and tectonics ==
=== Basement and Paleozoic rocks ===
Uzbekistan's Variscan Paleozoic basement rock is divided into eight main zones. The Karakum-Tajik microcontinent has four tectonic zones in the metamorphic basement rock. The lower units of the southern Baysoon Unit are mainly late Proterozoic high-pressure metamorphic rocks—mainly meta-ultramafic or meta-acidic, gray and coarse. The exact origin of these rocks is uncertain, although they are inferred to have originated from island arc volcanism. They are overlain by unmetamorphosed carbonates from the late Silurian through the middle Devonian, with an angular unconformity at the base. Another angular unconformity above separates these rocks from volcanic and continental sedimentary rocks, with 300 metres (980 ft) thick conglomerate at the base, ascending to pebbly limestone and metamorphic rocks. The upper unit is a 1.5 kilometres (4,900 ft) thick cooled lava and tuff overlain by sandstone, conglomerate and Carboniferous plant remnants.

The tectonic zone to the north has greater meta-pelagic rock presence and rare fossils from the Cambrian. The two peaks of metamorphic activity in the Karakum-Tajik microcontinent is associated with the time when the oceanic crust of the Turkestan Ocean subducted beneath the edge of the microcontinent. Collision with the Kazakh microcontinent produced a second pulse of metamorphism.

Metamorphic rocks are present at the base of volcanic rocks, along with recrystallized limestone. Basalt lava flows, tuff, limestone and sandstone from the early and middle Carboniferous overlie these rocks, with a thickness of three kilometers. Diabase dikes, gabbro and serpentinite are also common. In Uzbekistan's paleo-rift zone, volcanic rocks and gabbro are up to 7 kilometres (23,000 ft) thick, dropping to 2 kilometres (6,600 ft) around the edges of the zone.

The Karakum-Tajik microcontinent's other two zones cold high-temperature, but low-pressure metamorphic ophiolite complexes, overlain by Ordovician and Silurian flysch, tuff, andesite lava and shallow-water sandstone. In turn, these units are overlain by a thick carbonate sequence up to 3 kilometres (9,800 ft) thick.

Rocks left over from the Turkestan Ocean crust form allochthon units on the northern edge of the Karakum-Tajik microcontinent. In the western part of the Turkestan structure, in the Kyzylkum Desert, andesite lava flows and tuff overlie Ordovician-Silurian carbonate and pelite. Nappe formations, such as the Kulkuduk Unit are composed of basal serptinized dunite and lherzolite, with overlying harzburgite and layered gabbro. These are cut by granite dikes and intrusions and are overlain by tube basalt, pillow basalt and sedimentary rocks such as ophiolite breccia, green and red pelagic shales, limestone and olistoliths.

Geologists separate the Kazakh microcontinent into two zones: the Tamdy and Kurama units. The base of the Tamdy Unit is metabasic and metasedimentary rocks ranging from a few hundred meters to a few kilometers thick and reaching blueschist grade on the sequence of metamorphic facies. The lowermost unit is a serpentinized ultramafic mélange with eclogite fragments. It underlies Silurian-Devonian terrestrial and carbonate sedimentary rocks. These rocks are overlain by conglomerate and flysch from the Carboniferous, as well as acid tuff and Permian continental conglomerates.

By contrast, the Kurama Unit has Proterozoic paragneiss, orthogneiss and granite intrusions in its basement rocks. Isotope dating indicates ages ranging from 1.9 billion to 230 million years ago for the metamorphic rocks. Vendian age sandstone and conglomerate intercalate with basalt, limestone and tuff, unconformably overlying the basement rock. Typically, these units are one to two kilometers thick. The Kurama Unit has volcanic rocks from the Ordovician, Silurian turbidites and andesite flows. An angular unconformity separates these rocks from a Devonian molasse unit, striking to the northeast with layers of andesite and tuff and overlain by a 1 kilometre (3,300 ft) Devonian to Carboniferous carbonate unit. A 6 kilometres (20,000 ft) volcanic unit caps the sequence, extending into Early Triassic age.

=== Platform cover: Mesozoic-Cenozoic ===
Sedimentary rocks deposited on top of the two microcontinents beginning in the Mesozoic. Faulting during the Triassic through the Early Cretaceous limited deposition to only a few small depressions. Sandstone, shale and conglomerate from the Triassic are found in the Ustyurt Plateau and southern Uzbekistan, containing units of bauxite deposited above an unconformity. Particularly in the Fergana Basin and the Kughitang and Zaravshansky ridges or the Gasly-Bukhara Depression, Jurassic coal and fine grained sedimentary rocks are more common, with thicknesses of 150 to 300 meters. Late Jurassic deposits are similar in thickness and include cross-bedded sandstone and conglomerate.

Cretaceous rocks are most common in the Kyzylkum Desert, Gissar-Kughitang, Bukhara-Kiva Depression, Fergana Valley and around Tashkent, with carbonates, sandstones and red shales up to 900 metres (3,000 ft) thick. Aptian and Albian age (based on marine fossils) gray sandstone, limestone and shale are more common in the west and south.

In southern Uzbekistan, they are notable as oil and gas-bearing reservoir formations. Copper-rich sandstone is found close to the Gissar area. Except in the east, where bauxite and continental sandstone formed, the Cretaceous immersed Uzbekistan in a shallow sea that left behind limestone and gypsum.

With the beginning of the Cenozoic, in the Paleogene deposition changed leaving behind a sequence with thick green clay at the base, overlain by limestone and then sandstone and clay in the east. In the middle Paleogene, 500 metres (1,600 ft) thick sequences of gypsum and carbonate overlain by 600 metres (2,000 ft) of clay, sandstone and carbonate formed in other parts of the country, producing oil and gas in the lowest unit.

The thickest sedimentary rocks in the platform cover are from the Neogene. The lower unit, dubbed E type, includes sandstone, shale and conglomerate with layers of gypsum and salt. It is about 600 metres (2,000 ft) thick, dating to the Miocene and Pliocene, much of it formed in lake environments. The Middle Pliocene unit is up to 3.4 kilometers thick and deposited in connection with rapid uplift of the Tien Shan mountains. The second type of sedimentation—W type—includes one kilometer of lacustrine carbonate with small layers of gypsum, sandstone and salt, as well as a 500 to 700 metres (1,600 to 2,300 ft) top unit of red shale and sandstone.

During the last 2.5 million years in the Quaternary, sedimentary rocks deposited in river valleys, and repeating layers with conglomerate at the base ascending to sandstone and shale indicate four different phases of uplift. The Kyzylkum (or "red sand") Desert has 5 to 60 metres (16 to 197 ft) thick red sand dunes from the Quaternary.

== Economic geology ==
=== Energy ===
Coal: Uzbekistan has the second largest reserves of coal in Central Asia. The nation's coal production is mainly from the Tashkent Region where the most significant mines are the Angren coal mine (the largest coal mine in the country) and the nearby Apartak coal mine. These two mines work lignite of Jurassic age. They are open-cast workings and together they account for 90% of the nation's coal production.

In addition to the raw coal extracted from the open-cast pit, an underground coal gasification plant at Angren was established in 1955 to produce gas for the Angren power station.

Uranium: Uzbekistan is the world’s fifth largest uranium producer but it has no domestic nuclear industry. Until independence in 1991 the sole consumer was the larger Soviet Union, since 1992 the US and China have both been major consumers.

The earliest mining began at Uchquduq, in 1953, and uranium mining is still focused on the Kyzylkum area of the Navoiy Region. The ore has been worked both underground and by open-cast methods but more recently most of the uranium extracted in Uzbekistan is recovered by in-situ leaching.

Most of the economic uranium deposits are hosted in sandstone roll-front deposits at shallow depths. The uranium in the rollfronts at Uchquduq is considered to derived from uraniferous black shales in the early Paleozoic basement nearby.

=== Metals ===
Uzbekistan is one of the world's major gold producers. In 2024 the nation's production volume was 129 tonnes, which placed it as the world's tenth largest gold producer for that year. There are several significant producing mines in the Navoiy Region which are operated by the Navoi Mining and Metallurgical Company.

Significant metalliferous mines in Uzbekistan

== Works cited ==
- Moores, E.M.; Fairbridge, Rhodes W. (1997). Encyclopedia of European & Asian Regional Geology. Springer. pp. 768–772. ISBN 978-041274040-4.
