= Waw an Namus =

Volcano in Libya

- Wau-en-Namus, Uau en Namus, Waw an Namous
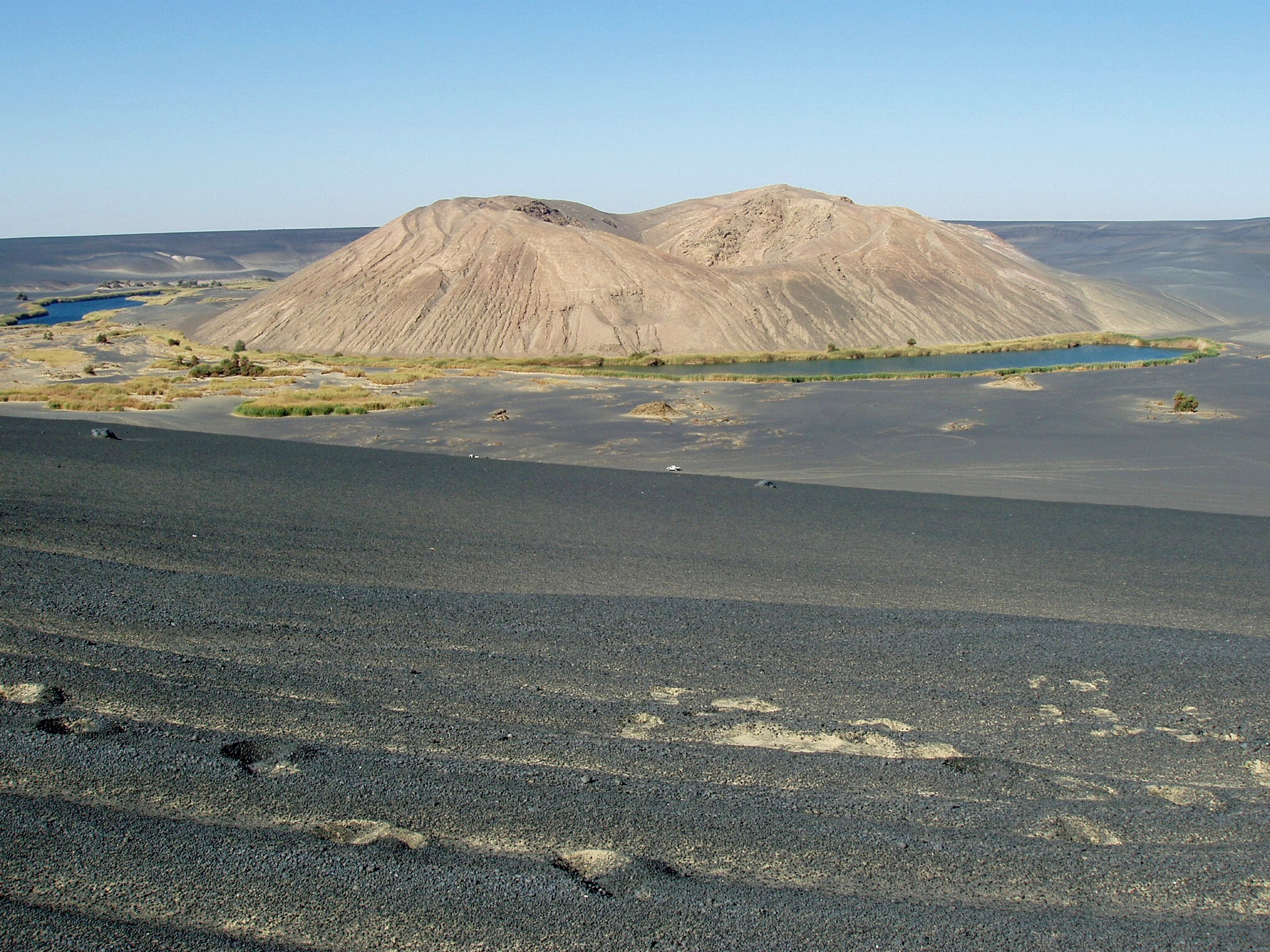
- The central cone of Waw an Namus

Highest point
- Coordinates: 24°55′03″N 17°45′46″E

Naming
- English translation: Oasis of mosquitoes

Geography
- Location within Libya

Geology
- Rock age: Pleistocene
- Mountain type: Caldera

Waw an Namus (also spelled Wau-en-Namus, Arabic: واو الناموس) is a volcano in Libya. Of either Pleistocene or Holocene age, it is located within the eastern Fezzan region. The origin of the volcanism there and at Al Haruj farther north is not clear. Radiometric dating has yielded an age of about 200,000 years, but other circumstantial evidence points to a formation of the volcano during Holocene or even historical times.

Waw an Namus is characterized by a caldera surrounded by an apron of dark tephra, which has a notable colour contrast to the surrounding desert terrain of the Sahara. A smaller crater lies northwest of the Waw an Namus caldera. The caldera itself contains a scoria cone. Several small lakes and associated vegetation are located within the caldera.

== Name ==
The volcano is also known as Uaw en Namus, Uau en Namus, Wau-en-Namus and Wau Sqair. It means "oasis of mosquitoes", a reference to the small lakes around it and the numerous mosquitoes that exist at Waw an Namus, nurtured by the lakes at the volcano.

== Geography and geomorphology ==
The volcano lies within the Sahara, in the eastern Fezzan, and was discovered by scientists a few decades before 1951. The caravan route between Kufra and Sebha passes by the volcano. Ancient graves have been found at Waw an Namus. While the oasis was probably visited by herders and hunters and may have been a source of raw materials, the place is otherwise uninhabited. The landscape around Waw an Namus has been described as "very beautiful" and is reportedly a tourism target, but logistical issues and the Libyan Civil War make it difficult to access the area.

Waw an Namus is a 100-metre-deep (330 ft), 4-kilometre-wide (2.5 mi) caldera, which has a small relief outwards and a steep margin inwards. During its formation, over 800,000,000 cubic metres (2.8×10^{10} ft^{3}) of rock were displaced. Another crater lies 5 kilometres (3.1 mi) northwest from Waw an Namus. That vent was formed by overlapping craters which feature no volcanic rocks and which have produced salty mud; this may have been a site of phreatic activity and of volcanic degassing. The caldera contains ash deposits and some dunes, but also a humid zone with reeds.

Within the caldera lies a 140-metre-high (460 ft), 1.3-kilometre-wide (0.81 mi) scoria cone constructed out of phreatomagmatic material with an 80-metre-deep (260 ft), 150-metre-wide (490 ft) crater. Another crater, now reduced to remnants, is located west of the summit crater of the cone. The cone has been modified by gullies.

Dark-coloured tephra of basaltic composition has buried the desert sand around the caldera to distances of 10–20 kilometres (6.2–12.4 mi), resulting in a conspicuous colour contrast to the much brighter desert sand. This contrast can be noted even on spaceborne images. The tephra deposit consists of volcanic ash and lapilli and covers a surface of about 300 square kilometres (120 mi^{2}). Waves 2 to 150 centimetres (0.79 to 59.06 in) high are formed by the tephra, which in its western part is baked together by mudflows. The tephra deposit is stratified, implying that it was generated by more than one eruption. Trade winds have blown the tephra over 100 kilometres (62 mi) southwestward, and a large number of megaripples formed by volcanic material occur both inside and outside of the caldera.

=== Lakes ===
Also within the caldera are three small lakes and additional smaller water bodies, which together form a semicircle around the northern, eastern, and southern flanks of the central cone. One of the lakes is north of the scoria cone, the second southeast, and south and the third southwest. These lakes cover a total surface of 0.3 square kilometres (0.12 mi^{2}), and the largest lake has a surface area of 0.146 square kilometres (0.056 mi^{2}) with a depth of 12.5 metres (41 ft), while the deepest of these waterbodies reaches 15–16 metres (49–52 ft). The water surface reaches 434 metres (1,424 ft) elevation above sea level, although seasonal variations sometimes cause the lakebodies to dry up. These lakes, some of which have red colours, give Waw an Namus a multicoloured appearance.

The lakes are probably groundwater-fed, as evaporation in the area greatly exceeds precipitation, with the lakes losing about 1,500,000 cubic metres (1,200 acre⋅ft) of water per year. Freshwater springs nourish the lakes. At least one water body was reported to be fresh in 1951, while the others are warm and saline. Deuterium isotope-ratio analysis indicates that the water at Waw an Namus is recent water, certainly more recent than 8,000 years.

== Geology ==
Waw an Namus is an isolated volcano. About 70 kilometres (43 mi) north lie lava flows of basaltic composition and the Haruj volcanic field, which Waw an Namus is sometimes considered to be a part of. These in turn are only two out of several large but little-known volcanic fields in the Sahara. A number of theories have been proposed to explain the volcanism in the Sahara, such as the activation of ancient crustal lineaments by the collision between Africa and Europe; in the case of Waw an Namus, the magmas originated in the mantle at about 130 kilometres (81 mi) deep, and include both asthenosphere and lithosphere components that underwent metasomatism before melting. The processes at Haruj and Waw an Namus were probably different.

The terrain surrounding Waw an Namus is covered by Quaternary sediments. The basement beneath the volcano is crystalline, and is in turn covered by limestone, marl, and the Nubian Sandstone.

Alkali basalts have been identified in the scoria, and the occurrence of foidite has been reported. Minerals contained within these rocks include apatite, clinopyroxene, magnetite, nepheline, and olivine, and occasionally melilite and sodalite. The rocks contain xenoliths of harzburgite, lherzolite, and peridotite. Sulfur occurs within the crater of the scoria cone, as well as white deposits that may be formed by alunite.

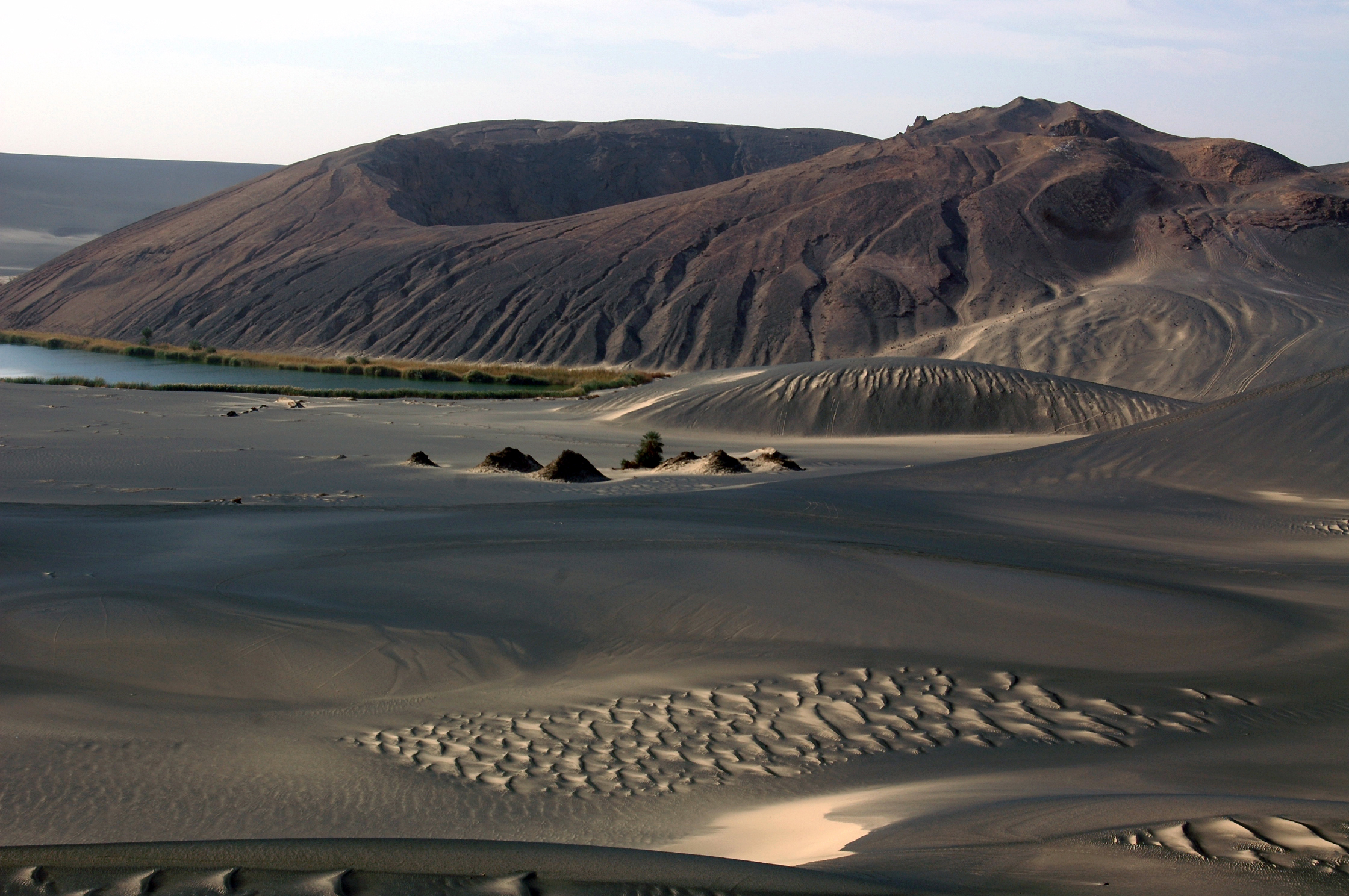
The central cone

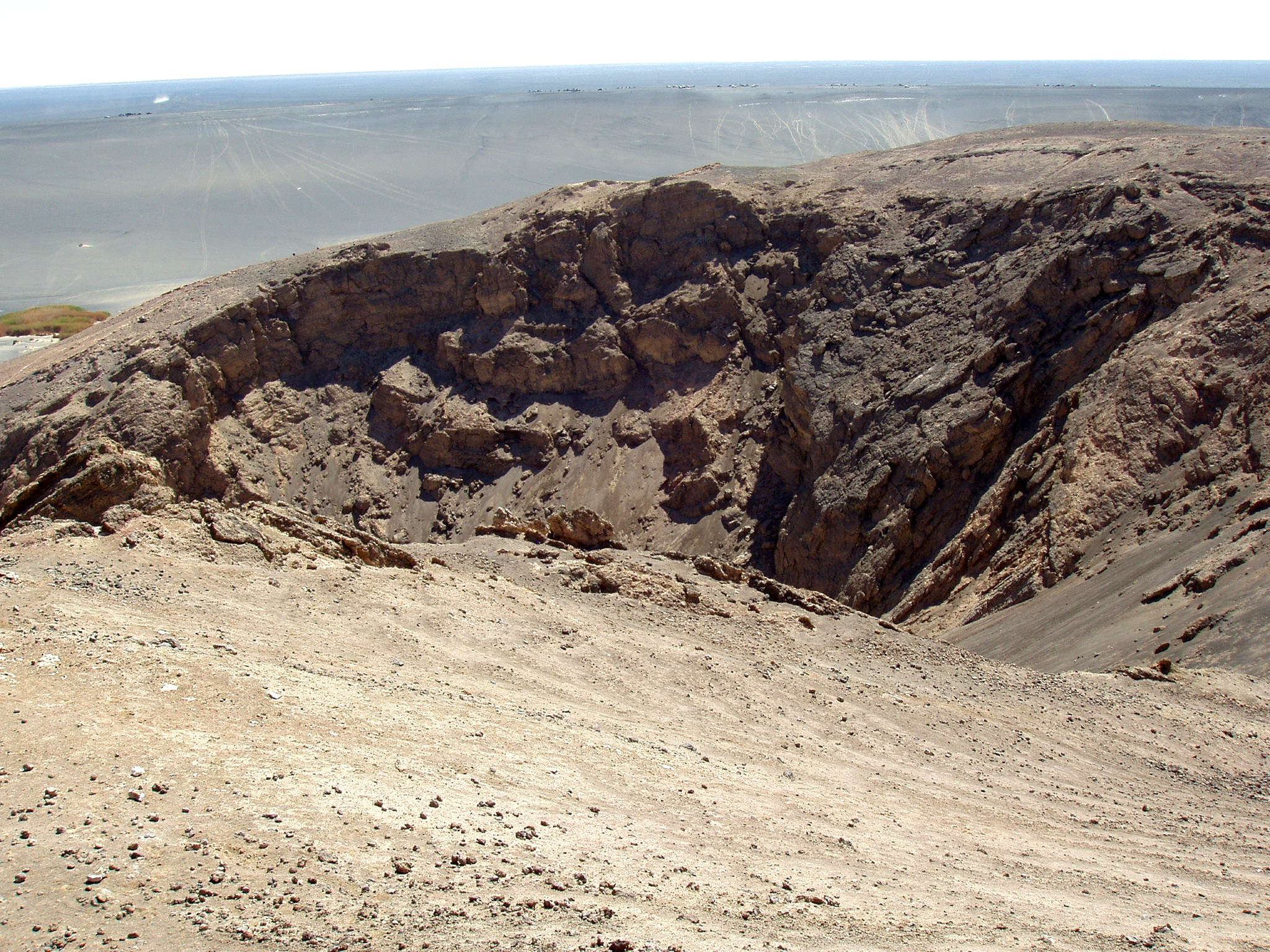
The central crater

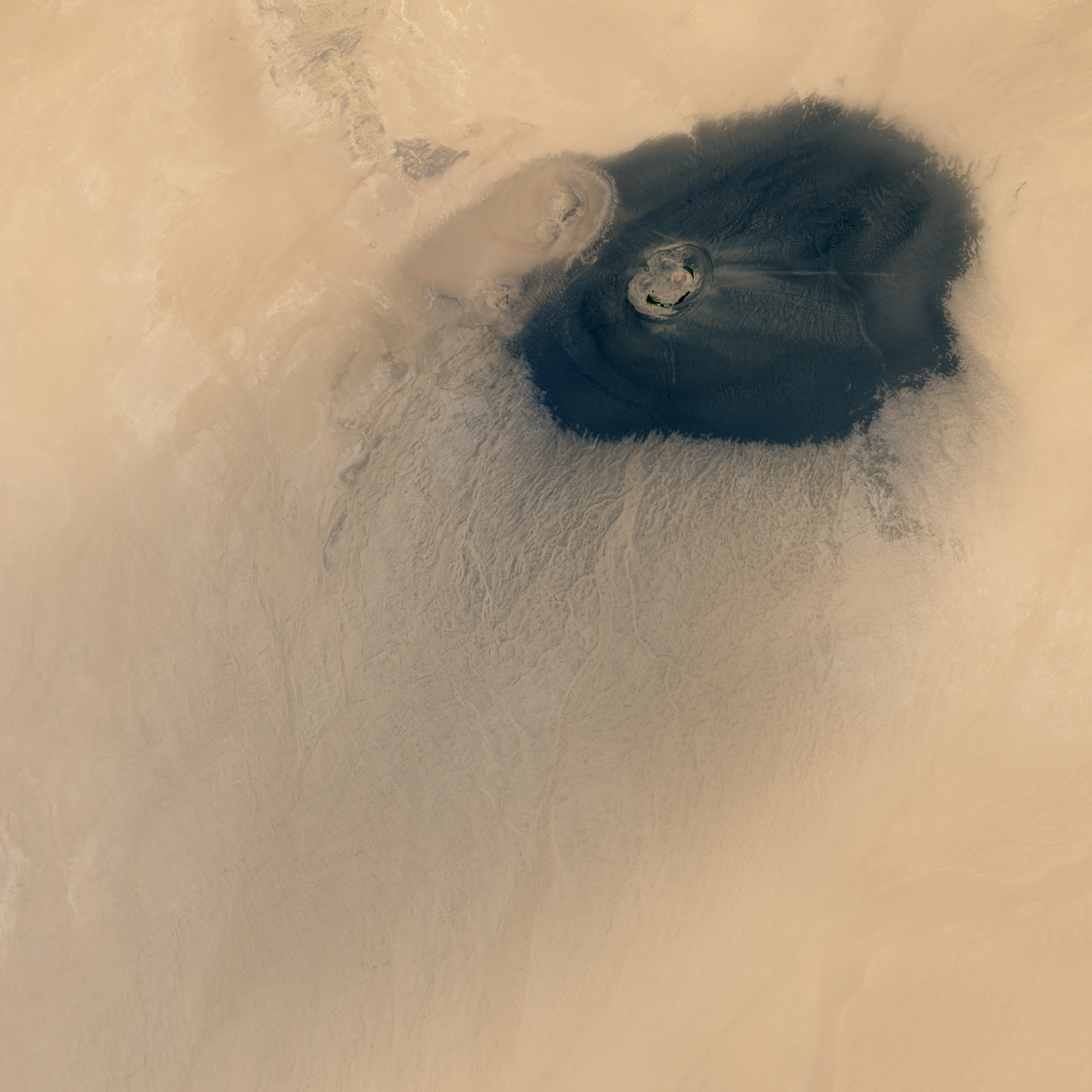
Waw an Namus seen from space, showing the colour contrast and the lateral crater

== Climate ==
Waw an Namus is part of the Sahara desert, one of the world's largest and driest deserts, although parts of it were wetter in the past. Some parts of the Sahara have received rain only a few times per century; at Waw an Namus, the little precipitation mostly occurs during winter. Wind is the most important weather factor, forming ventifacts and dunes among other structures; at Waw an Namus it mostly blows from the northeast and is sometimes accompanied by dust devils south of the volcano.

== Eruptive history ==
The central scoria cone may be only a few thousand years old, possibly even of historical age. The arid climate may mislead as to its actual age, as there is little erosion in the desert. Early geological studies estimated an age of less than 800–1,000 years. Salty muds and rocks erupted by the scoria cone and the crater northwest of the main Waw an Namus caldera must have been emplaced after the last pluvial. The Waw an Namus caldera cuts a Holocene drainage system in the Sahara, and there is no evidence of Neolithic artifacts at Waw an Namus, further supporting a recent origin of the volcano.

Radiometric dating failed to yield a reliable age for the rocks; only an imprecise age of 690,000±1,000,000 years ago was obtained. Later potassium-argon dating yielded an age of 200,000±9,000 years before present for a lava bomb associated with the central cone, and the Global Volcanism Program assigns a Pleistocene age to Waw an Namus. Hot springs are active at Waw an Namus and produce sulfurous water.

== Biology ==
Acacias, date palms, doum palms, and tamarisks (including Tamarix tetragyna) grow within the caldera, as well as swamp vegetation to varying degrees. Part of the largest lake is covered with reeds (including Phragmites australis) up to 4 metres (13 ft) high; smaller reeds and tamarisks grow around the saline lake as well.

Animal life includes aquatic birds, flies, and mosquitoes. The oasis has a rich bird life; among the birds are the ducks Anas clypeata (northern shoveler), Anas crecca (Eurasian teal), and Anas strepera (gadwall), as well as Acrocephalus scirpaceus (Eurasian reed warbler), Anthus cervinus (red-throated pipit), Anthus pratensis (meadow pipit), Bubulcus ibis (western cattle egret), Corvus ruficollis (brown-necked raven), Falco biarmicus (lanner falcon), Fulica atra (Eurasian coot), Gallinula chloropus (common moorhen), Luscinia svecica (bluethroat), Motacilla alba (white wagtail), Oenanthe deserti (desert wheatear), Passer simplex (desert sparrow), Phoenicurus ochruros (black redstart), Phylloscopus collybita (common chiffchaff), Podyceps nigricollis (black-necked grebe), Rallus aquaticus (water rail), Saxicola rubicola (European stonechat), and Tachybaptus ruficollis (little grebe). Some migratory birds likely use Waw an Namus as an overwintering place. Among microbiota, cyanophyceae, diatoms, and green algae are found in the lake waters. (Note: Individual species are the cyanophyceae Anabaena variabilis, Eucapsis alpina, Microcoleus steenstrupii and Pseudoanabaena africana and the diatoms Amphiprora duplex, Amphora coffeaeformis, Amphora duplex, Amphora ocellata, Amphora subtilissima, Amphora veneta, Anomoeoneis sphaerophora, Bacillaria paradoxa, Cocconeis placentula, Cymbella pusilla, Denticula sp., Mastogloia aquilegiae, Melosira goetzeana, Navicula interruptestriata, Nitschia amphibia, Nitzschia hybrida, Nitzschia sigma, Nitzscia iugiformis, Nitzscia richterae, Nitzscia sigma, Rhopalodia gibberula, Rhopalodia musculus, Stephanodiscus astraea and Synedra tabulata.)

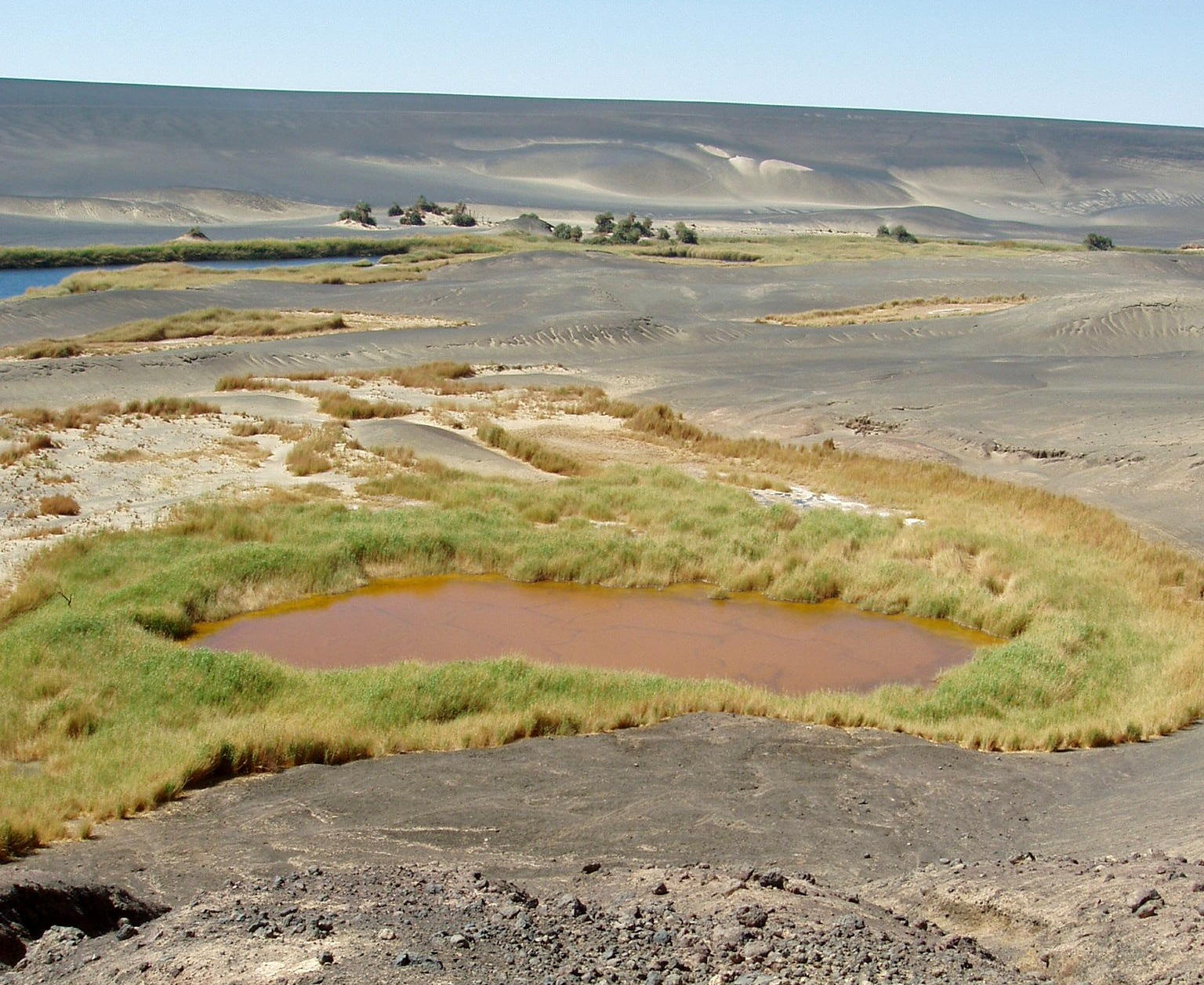
A lake at Waw an Namus

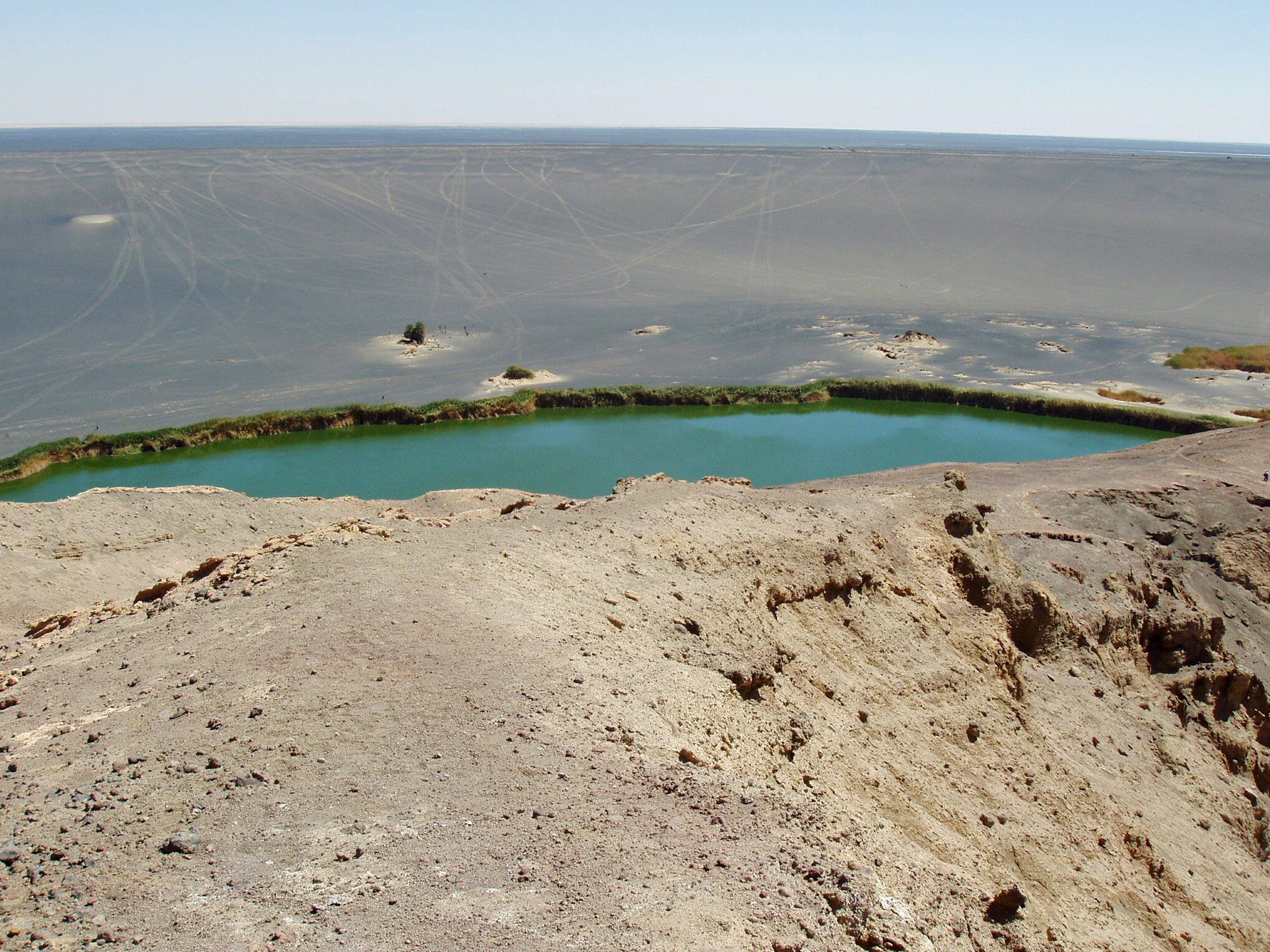
A green lake seen from the central cone

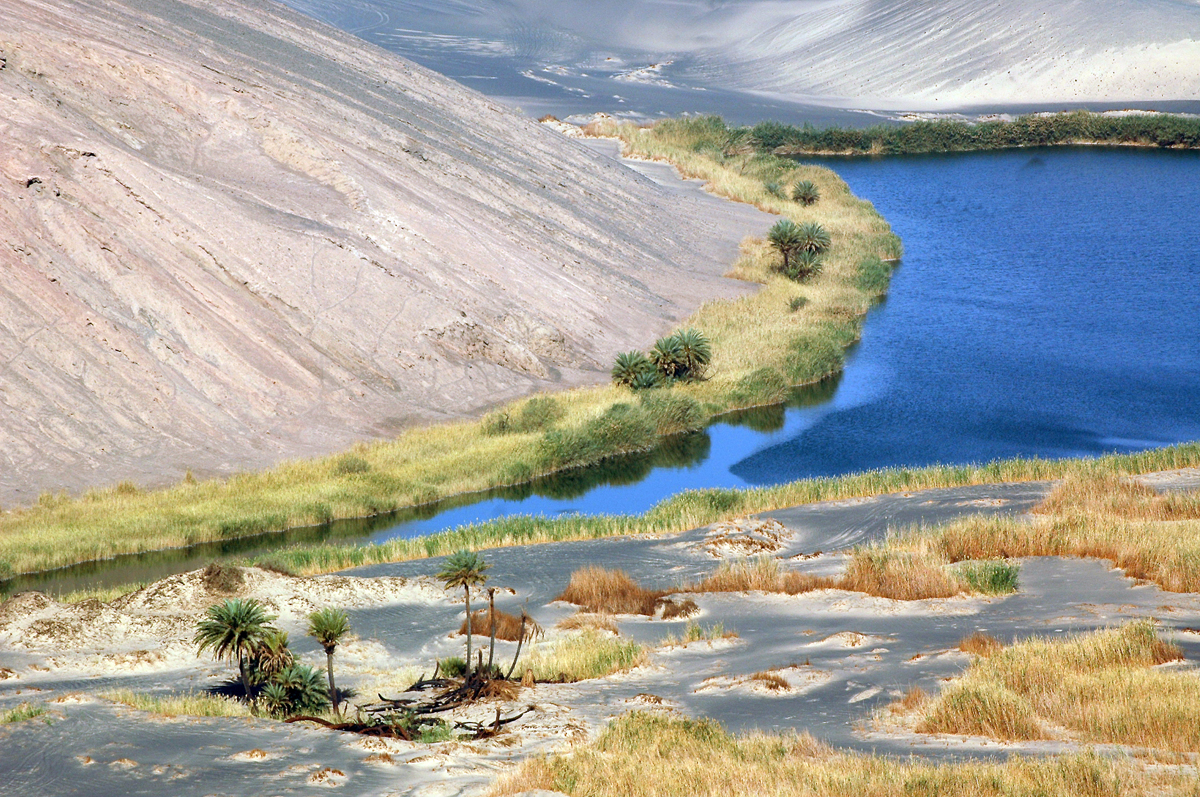
Vegetation surrounding one of the lakes at Waw an Namus

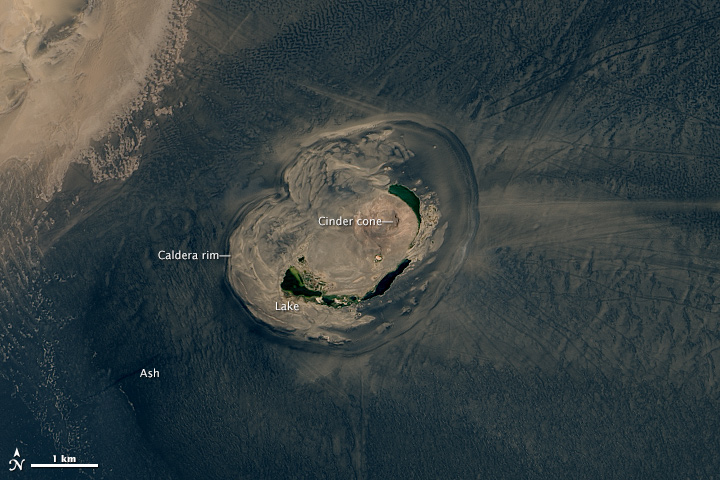
The caldera

== See also ==
- List of volcanoes in Libya
