= List of ophiolites =

Ophiolites are sequences of mafic to ultramafic rock generally believed to represent ancient oceanic lithosphere. They are distributed all across the world being all of them located at present or past orogenic belts, sites of mountain building processes.

Ophiolites are common in orogenic belts of Mesozoic age, like those formed by the closure of the Tethys Ocean. Ophiolites in Archean and Paleoproterozoic domains are rare.

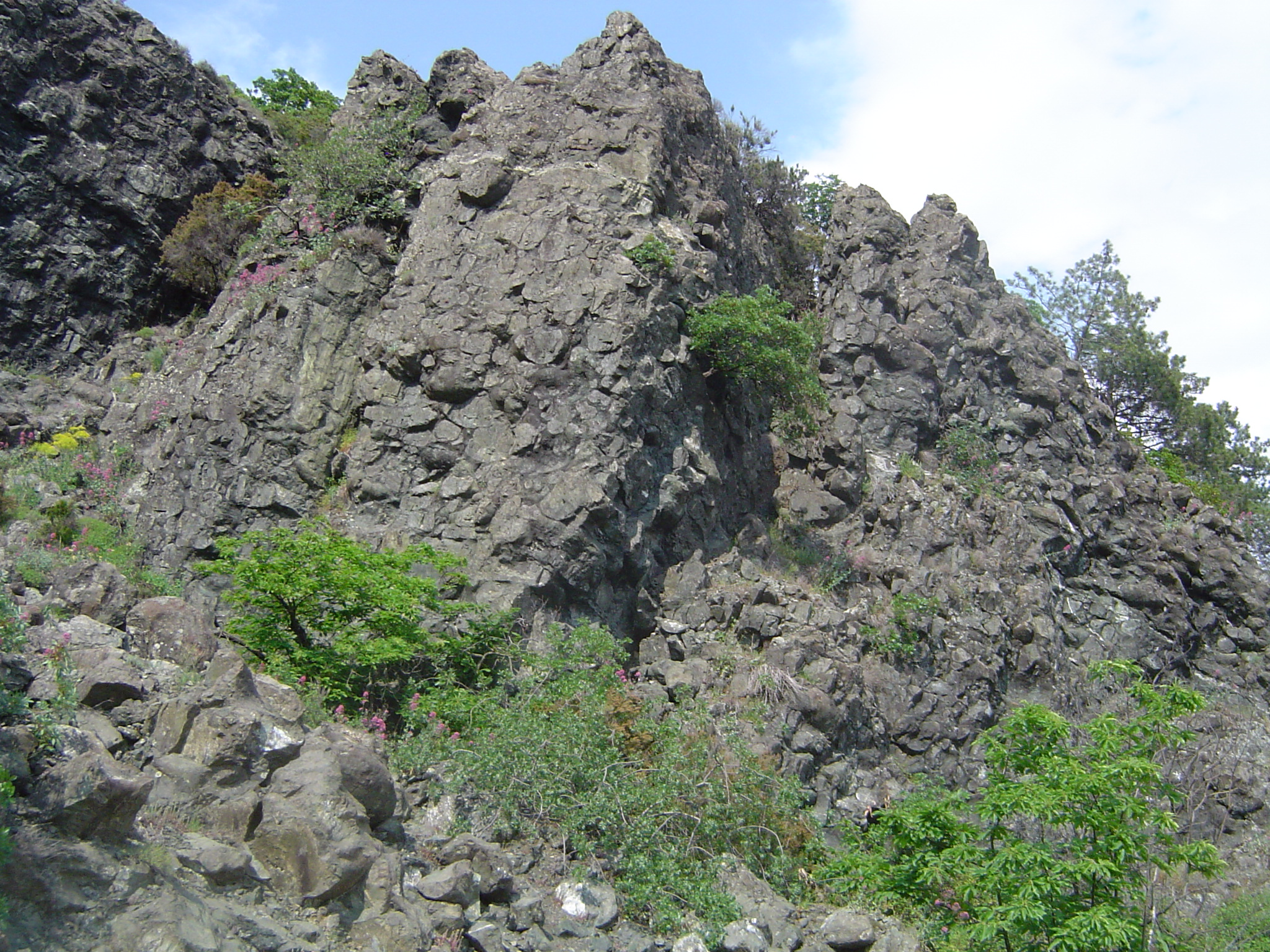
A pillow lava from an ophiolite sequence, Northern Apennines, Italy

== Mediterranean and Peri-Arabic ==
- Morais ophiolite complex, Portugal
- Internal Ligurian Ophiolites in Northern Apennines, Italy
- Troodos Ophiolite in the Troodos Mountains of Cyprus
- Kizildag ophiolite, southern Turkey
- Mirdita Ophiolite, middle Jurassic ophiolite in northern Albania between the Apulian and Pelagonian subcontinents in the Balkan Peninsula
- Cap Corse ophiolite, Corsica, France
- Vourinos and Pindos Ophiolites in Northern Greece and their northern extensions (numerous ophiolite bodies) in Albania, Serbia and Bosnia
- Ronda peridotite, Southern Spain
- Lherz Massif, France
- Beni Bousera ophiolite, Morocco
- Golyamo Kamenyane Complex, Bulgaria
- Semail Ophiolite in Oman and the United Arab Emirates
- Makran Ophiolite, Makran, Iran and Pakistan
- Zagros ophiolite, Zagros Mountains, Iran
- Iraq Zagros ophiolites, Zagros Mountains, Iraq, includes; Cretaceous ophiolites (Mawat, Penjwen, Pushtashan, Hassanbig and Bulfat) and Eocene ophiolites (Rayat and Qalander).

== Tibetan ==
- Dongbo ophiolite
- Loubusa ophiolite
- Purang ophiolite

== Circumpacific ==
=== Asia-Pacific ===
- Zambales Ophiolite in western Luzon, Philippines
- Angat Ophiolite in eastern Luzon, Philippines
- Rapu-rapu Ophiolite Complex in eastern Philippines
- Southeast Bohol Ophiolite Complex in Bohol, Philippines
- Macquarie Island, Tasmania, Australia
- Palawan Ophiolite, western Philippines
- Papuan ophiolite in Papua New Guinea
- Yakuno, Horokanai, and Poroshiri, three full ophiolite sequences in Japan
- Dun Mountain Ophiolite Belt, South Island, New Zealand
- Naga-Manipur Ophiolite Complex, India

=== North American Cordillera ===
- Coast Range Ophiolite, in the California Coast Ranges from Santa Barbara through San Francisco Counties, California.
- Kings River ophiolite, southwest Sierra Nevada foothills, California
- Point Sal ophiolite, Point Sal, Santa Barbara County, Southern California.
- California ophiolite, Smartville Block of the Sierra Nevada, and the Klamath Mountains, northern California
- Josephine Ophiolite in Southern Oregon
- Canyon Mountain and Sparta Complexes ophiolite, Northeastern Oregon
- Payson Ophiolite, Payson, Arizona.
- Metchosin Igneous Complex ophiolite, southern Vancouver Island, British Columbia, Canada
- Ingalls Terrane ophiolite, Cascade Mountains, Washington
- Fidalgo Complex ophiolite, Skagit County, Washington.

=== Mexico and the Caribbean ===
- Olivos ophiolite, Chihuahua, Mexico
- Vizcaino ophiolite, Baja California Sur, Mexico
- Cuban ophiolititic belt
- Puerto Rican ophiolite

=== Andes ===
- La Tetilla Ophiolite Complex, near Popayán, Colombian Cordillera Occidental (Andes)
- Famatinian Ophiolites, near Famatina in the Argentine Andes.
- Tapo ophiolite, Peru
- Taitao ophiolite
- Rocas Verdes ophiolites, Patagonian Andes, Chile

- Tortuga ophiolite complex
- Sarmiento ophiolite complex

== Brazil ==
- Quatipuru ophiolite, Brazil
- Cerro Mantiqueiras Ophiolite, Rio Grande do Sul, Brazil

== Eastern North America ==
- Betts Cove, St. Anthony, Little Port, Advocate, Gander River, Pipestone Pond, Great Bend and Annieopsquotch ophiolites in Newfoundland
- Bay of Islands Ophiolite in Gros Morne National Park, Newfoundland, named a UNESCO World Heritage Site in 1987 because of its superbly exposed complete ophiolite stratigraphic sequence
- Thetford Mines ophiolite Complex (Thetford Mines, Cantons de l'Est, Québec, Canada)
- Piney Branch Complex located near Fairfax, Virginia, is a Neoproterozoic ophiolite. The formation contains highly metamorphosized mafic and ultramafic rocks. Rocks found here include Serpentinite, asbestiform actinolite schist, Tremolite, and soapstone.
- Asbestos ophiolite (Asbestos, Cantons de l'Est, Québec, Canada)
- Mont Orford ophiolite (Magog, Cantons de l'Est, Québec, Canada)
- Mont Albert ophiolite (Gaspésie, Québec, Canada)
- Maryland ophiolite in the central Appalachian orogen, Baltimore, Maryland.

== Northern Europe ==
- Ballantrae Complex, Girvan-Ballantrae area, SW Ayrshire, Scotland
- Jormua Ophiolite, Finland
- Karmøy ophiolite, Scandinavian Mountains, Norway
- Leka Ophiolite, Scandinavian Mountains, Norway
- Løkken Ophiolite, Scandinavian Mountains, Norway
- Nuttio Ophiolite, Finland
- Solund-Stavfjord Ophiolite, Scandinavian Mountains, Norway
- Lizard complex in Cornwall, United Kingdom
- Outokumpu Ophiolite, Finland
- Shetland Ophiolite, Unst and Fetlar, Shetland, Scotland
