= Haruj =

Volcanic field in Libya

- Haroudj
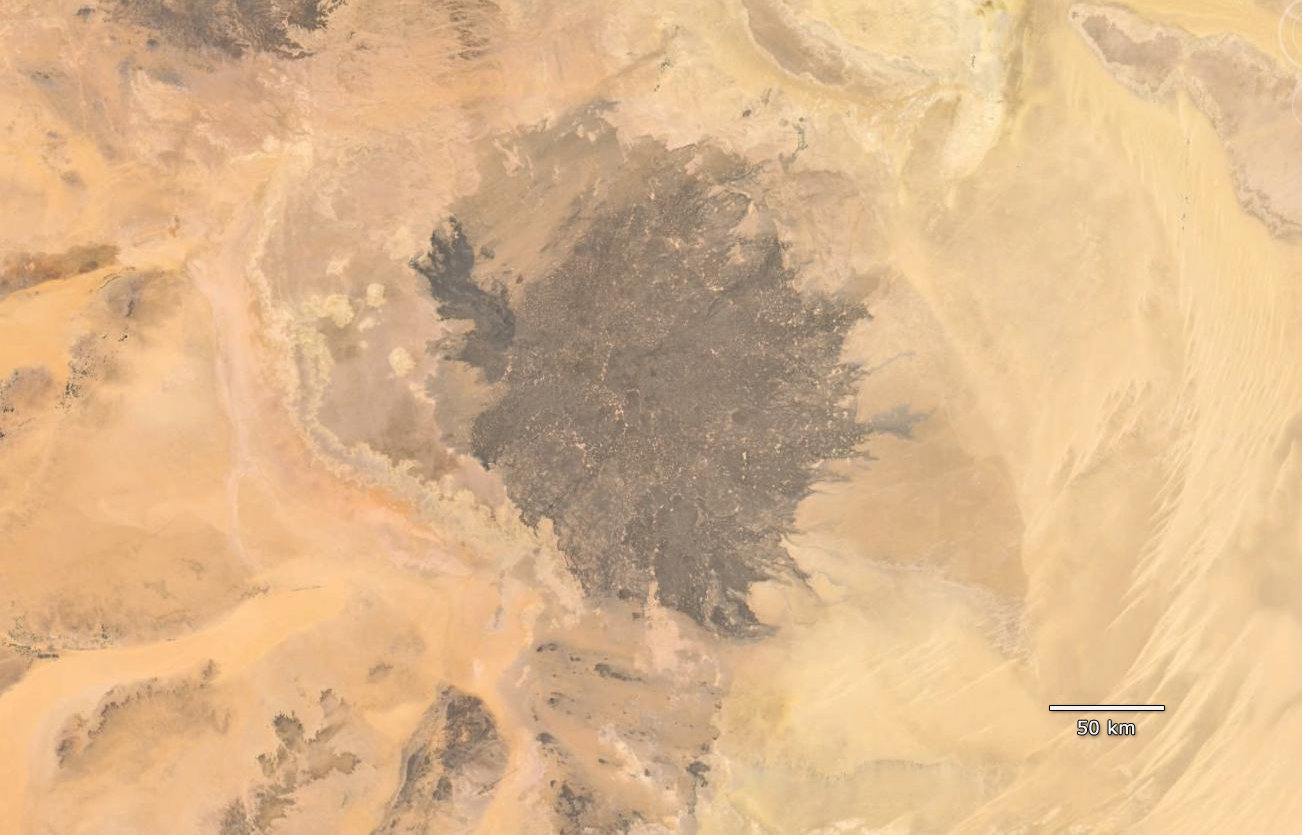
- Haruj seen from space

Highest point
- Elevation: 1,200 m (3,900 ft)
- Listing: Garet es Sebaa
- Coordinates: 27°15′N 17°30′E"Haruj". Global Volcanism Program. Smithsonian Institution.

Naming
- Native name: هروج (Arabic)

Geography
- Location within Libya
- Country: Libya
- District: Jufra

Geology
- Rock age: Pliocene to Holocene
- Mountain type: Volcanic field
- Rock type: Tholeiitic-alkali basalt
- Last eruption: 2,310 ± 810 years ago

Haruj (Arabic: هروج, also known as Haroudj) is a large volcanic field spread across 42,000–45,000 km^{2} (16,000–17,000 sq mi) in central Libya. It is one of several volcanic fields in Libya along with Tibesti, and its origin has been attributed to the effects of geologic lineaments in the crust.

It contains about 150 volcanoes, including numerous basaltic scoria cones and about 30 small shield volcanoes, along with craters and lava flows. Most of the field is covered by lava flows that originated in fissure vents; the rest of the flows originated within small shield volcanoes, stratovolcanoes and scoria cones. Some of these vents have large craters. Volcanism in Haruj blocked ancient rivers and led to the formation of Lake Megafezzan.

Volcanic activity in Haruj began about 6 million years ago and continued into the late Pleistocene. A number of individual lava flow generations were emplaced in the Haruj volcanic field, the most recent ones in the Holocene 2,310 ± 810 years ago. There are reports of solfataric activity.

== Geography and geomorphology ==
Haruj lies in central Libya and its highest summit is Garet es Sebaa, 1,200 metres (3,900 ft) above sea level. It was first identified as volcanic in 1797 and had a reputation for being challenging to access owing to its remoteness and the hostile terrain and was thus avoided by explorers. The town of Al-Foqaha is located 15 kilometres (9.3 mi) northwest of the margin of Haruj, and oil fields can be found north of the field.

The field is a low-relief expanse of volcanic rocks occasionally interrupted by volcanic cones which covers an area of 42,000–45,000 square kilometres (16,000–17,000 sq mi), making it the largest of the basaltic volcanic fields of Northern Africa. Its eruption products reach a thickness of 300 to 400 metres (980 to 1,310 ft) in the central sector in the form of stacked lava flows. The total volume of volcanic rocks has been estimated to be about 5,000 km^{3} (1,200 cu mi). The Al Haruj al Aswad ("Black mountain") field in the northern part of Haruj and Al Haruj al Abyad ("White mountain") south are considered to be subdivisions of the main Haruj volcanic field with Aswad covering a much larger surface than Abyad, or even two separate volcanoes that started overlapping each other during the Pliocene.

Older lava flows have been completely flattened by erosion, while more recent ones still display fresh surface structures and some of the recent flows flowed out of the mountains into the surrounding landscapes. Surface features include both aa lava traits and pahoehoe lava traits, and there are lava channels, skylights and tumuli. The volcanic rocks are usually not very thick, their thickness decreasing from 145 metres (476 ft) in the central sector to only a few metres at the margins, and thus the underlying sedimentary rocks often crop out between lava flows.

=== Vents ===
Most of the lavas appear to originate in fissure vents, under the influence of dykes and tectonic faults. In addition, there are about 150 individual volcanic massifs and more smaller volcanic cones, many of which form rows of cones and sometimes have large craters and which occur mainly in the Al Haruj al Abyad part of Haruj. Craters range from deep pits with steep inward walls to wide and shallow depressions, and the craters are often filled with material eroded from their flanks. Phreatomagmatic processes triggered by groundwater interacting with rising magma have generated some of these large craters, while others formed when lava lakes drained through gaps in their rims. Like the fissure vents, the position of individual cones and massifs is controlled by ground fractures and often reflect the activity of dykes, and some cones appear to have been active more than once.

There are about 30 shield volcanoes with heights of 100 to 400 metres (330 to 1,310 ft), such as Um el Garanigh and Um el Glaa, and smaller stratovolcanoes with heights of 80 to 250 metres (260 to 820 ft) such as Garet el Graabia in the field; some stratovolcanoes are located on shield volcanoes. Scoria cones consist of lapilli, lava bombs, and tuffs, with pyroclastic material exposed in the crater rims. The formation of scoria cones was at times accompanied by subplinian eruptions that deposited tephra over large areas.

==== Hydrology ====
Small depressions in the lava fields contain clay-filled ephemeral lakes, and a drainage network has developed in parts of the field, which sometimes carries water during spring. Some craters show evidence of former and ephemeral crater lakes. Beginning in the Messinian, growth of the volcanic field blocked pre-existing drainages, forming a closed basin southwest of Haruj that was filled by Lake Megafezzan, although it is possible that the lake at times overflowed across the volcanic field.

== Geology ==
Haruj is not located close to a plate boundary. Rather, volcanism there and in other African volcanic fields that are located on top of crustal domes has been explained by the presence of hotspots, but in the case of Haruj, a mantle plume is considered unlikely. Alternatively, volcanism at Haruj may be the consequence of the intersection of three geological structures of Paleozoic to Tertiary age and melting of the shallow mantle, or of the rifting process of the Sirte Basin. Wau an Namus is sometimes considered to be part of the field. Other volcanic fields in Libya are Gharyan, Gabal as Sawada, Gabal Nuqay, and Tibesti, some of which belong to a long line known as the Tibesti lineament. Volcanism in general has shifted southward over time, although more recent radiometric dating efforts indicate that volcanic activity in the fields was more contemporaneous than thought.

The volcanic field overlies a 250-to-530-metre-high (820 to 1,740 ft) Tertiary surface between the Paleozoic to Tertiary Murzuk and Sirte Basins; the Syrte embayment during the Miocene reached into the Haruj mountains. A number of swells and tectonic lineaments, some of which are located at the margins between geologic blocks, characterize the basement beneath Haruj and have influenced the location of volcanic vents. The basement is of Eocene to Oligocene age and consists of conglomerate, dolomite, limestone, marl, and sandstone, known as the Bishimah Formation; where the lavas of Haruj are thinner, it often forms white outcrops.

=== Composition ===
Eruptions at Haruj have produced relatively uniform volcanic rocks consisting of olivine basalt that forms a tholeiitic to alkali basalt suite; the alkaline basalts were originally interpreted as hawaiite. Minerals contained within the volcanic rocks include clinopyroxene, olivine, plagioclase, and titanomagnetite, with secondary calcite, iddingsite, serpentine, and zeolite. Based on compositional differences, the volcanic rocks have been subdivided into an older and a younger family.

In some places in the northern Haruj a modified basalt has been found, which is dense and whose olivine has been transformed into iddingsite. The lavas contain inclusions of lithic material as well as pyroxene and peridotite lherzolite. Phonolite and trachyte are absent. The magmas ultimately originated at depths of 70 to 74 kilometres (43 to 46 mi).

== Eruption history ==
The oldest volcanic rocks in Haruj appear to be not older than Pliocene, although the presence of buried Miocene age flows in the northern sector of the field has been suggested. The oldest eruptions have been dated to be either 6.4 million years old or of Late Pliocene age, and activity was originally thought to have continued to the Late Pleistocene; Wau an Namus may be 200,000 years old. Most of the field is younger than 2.2 million years ago and output appears to have decreased over time. Some eruptions may have been large enough to impact the regional environment.

Volcanic activity in Haruj has been subdivided into a variable number of phases, including a six-generation scheme and a four-class scheme based on composition and age. Radiometric dating has yielded a Late Pliocene age for the oldest lava-flow generation, and ages established by paleomagnetic analysis are coherent with those established on the basis of the degree of erosion of flows. The oldest generation of lava flows makes up the bulk of the field and has been completely flattened by erosion, with few exceptions. Pre-existent valleys have influenced the emplacement of the oldest-generation lava flows, and also that of the second-oldest, albeit to a lesser degree.

An intermediary lava-flow generation has most likely been emplaced during the Pleistocene. Lava flows of intermediate age crop out mainly in the central part of the Haruj mountains and have recognizable flow forms. Their surfaces have lost the original microstructures and are often covered with large blocks.

The youngest generations of lava flows are little eroded, although they can still be subdivided into an older generation that has lost most of its surface features and a younger generation with fresh surfaces. This younger generation has been inferred to post-date a wet period that commenced 4000 BCE and the Neolithic; the youngest dates obtained on lava flows are 2310±810 years BP. Prior to the discovery of these youngest dates, volcanic activity was believed to have ended 100,000 years ago.

Haruj may still be active, considering the presence of partial melt at the bottom of the crust and the seismic activity of the Hun Graben. Some toponyms such as Garet Kibrit ("sulfur mountain") refer to volcanic activity, and solfataric activity has been reported in the field.

== Climate, animal life and vegetation ==
Temperatures in Haruj fluctuate between 12 and 32 °C (54 and 90 °F) in January and July respectively. The volcanic field lies within an arid climate with annual precipitation of 5 to 25 millimetres (0.20 to 0.98 in), but the higher parts of the mountains are wetter than the surroundings. 6,000 years ago, the region was much wetter, and the extent of the Sahara was approximately half the size of today.

Vegetation occurs in dry valleys. Barbary sheep, birds, foxes, gazelles, and rabbits live in the valleys, and the Haruj is used as a pasture by Arabs and Tibbus. 4,000-year-old petroglyphs in the field show antelopes and cattle. Neolithic stone weapons made out of Haruj rocks have been found, and several millstones discovered in the Roman cities of Leptis Magna and Cyrene originated in the volcanic field.

== See also ==
- List of volcanoes in Libya
- List of volcanic fields
