= Ronda peridotite =

Peridotite body in Spain

Ronda peridotite is a 300-square-kilometre (120 sq mi) peridotite body in Betic Cordillera, southern Spain.

== See also ==
List of ophiolites: Mediterranean and Peri-Arabic ophiolites
