= Waw al Kabir =

Village in Libya

Waw al Kabir واو الكبير
- Village
- Waw al-Kabīr
- Interactive map of Waw al Kabir
- Coordinates: 25°19′20″N 16°42′55″E
- Country: Libya
- Governorate: Asyut
- District: Murzuq District

Waw al Kabir (Arabic: واو الكبير) is a town in the Murzuq District of Libya. It is located about 115.06 kilometres (71.49 mi) from Waw an Namus. Waw al Kabir is the administrative center of the Waw al Kabir municipality, which covers an area of 97,160 square kilometres (37,510 sq mi).

Waw al Kabir has a hot desert climate with extremely high temperatures and very low rainfall. The village receives an average of about 3.96 millimeters (0.16 inches) of precipitation and has 9.69 rainy days (2.65% of the time) annually. The town is surrounded by sand dunes and rocky hills and has a small airport, the Waw al Kabir Airport, with a 3.8-kilometre (2.4 mi) runway.
