= Adlafia minuscula =

Scientific classification
- Domain: Eukaryota
- Clade: Sar
- Clade: Stramenopiles
- Division: Ochrophyta
- Clade: Bacillariophyta
- Class: Bacillariophyceae
- Order: Cymbellales
- Family: Anomoeoneidaceae
- Genus: Adlafia
- Species: A. minuscula

Binomial name
- Adlafia minuscula (Grunow) Lange-Bertalot, 1999

Synonyms
- Adlafia muralis (Grunow) Monnier & Ector; Navicula minuscula Grunow, 1880 (basionym); Navicula muralis Grunow, 1880

Species of single-celled organism

Adlafia minuscula is a species of diatoms belonging to the family Anomoeoneidaceae.
