= List of volcanoes in Libya =

This is a list of active and extinct volcanoes in Libya.

Name	Elevation		Location	Last eruption
Name	meters	feet	Coordinates	Last eruption
Gharyan volcanic field	850	2790	32°N 13.25°E	Pleistocene
Haruj	1200	3937	27.25°N 17.50°E	2,310 ± 810 years ago
Waw an Namus	547	1795	24.55°N 17.46°E	Holocene
