= Jormua Ophiolite =

Remnant of ancient oceanic lithosphere near Jormua, Finland

Selection of outcrop localities mentioned in the text.

The Jormua Ophiolite (Finnish: Jormuan ofioliitti) is a remnant of ancient oceanic lithosphere near the village of Jormua close to the geographical centre of Finland. The rocks of the Jormua Ophiolite formed about 1,950 million years ago in the Paleoproteozoic Era. The conditions under which the ocean crust rocks of Jormua formed was likely similar to present-day Red Sea. Thus, a linear sea of this type is thought to have existed between two continental landmasses in Finland. At some point this sea closed and the ophiolite was obducted. The Jormua ophiolite is the best preserved one along a larger chain of ophiolites that occur within the Kainuu Schist Belt.

The Jormua Ophiolite is broken into 4 geographical blocks termed as the eastern block, central block, northern block, and western block. The eastern and northern blocks are most similar to one another containing mantle peridotites intruded by gabbro stocks and basaltic sheeted dikes. These are overlaid by a metabasaltic pillow lava layer which is directly overlain by black turbitic shales. These are best associated with an extrusive seafloor sequence. The central block lacks extrusive rocks, gabbro rocks and dikes but otherwise resembles the eastern and northern blocks. The main difference being EMORB dikes. The western block resembles the central block except its bounded by older archean basement rocks and its mantle peridotites are in general less depleted.

In review, the crustal rocks of the ophiolite include pillow lava, hyaloclastite, sheeted dykes, gabbro, plagiogranite and ultramafic cumulate rock. Mantle rocks exposed in the ophiolite are the peridotite varieties of lherzolite, harzburgite and dunite.

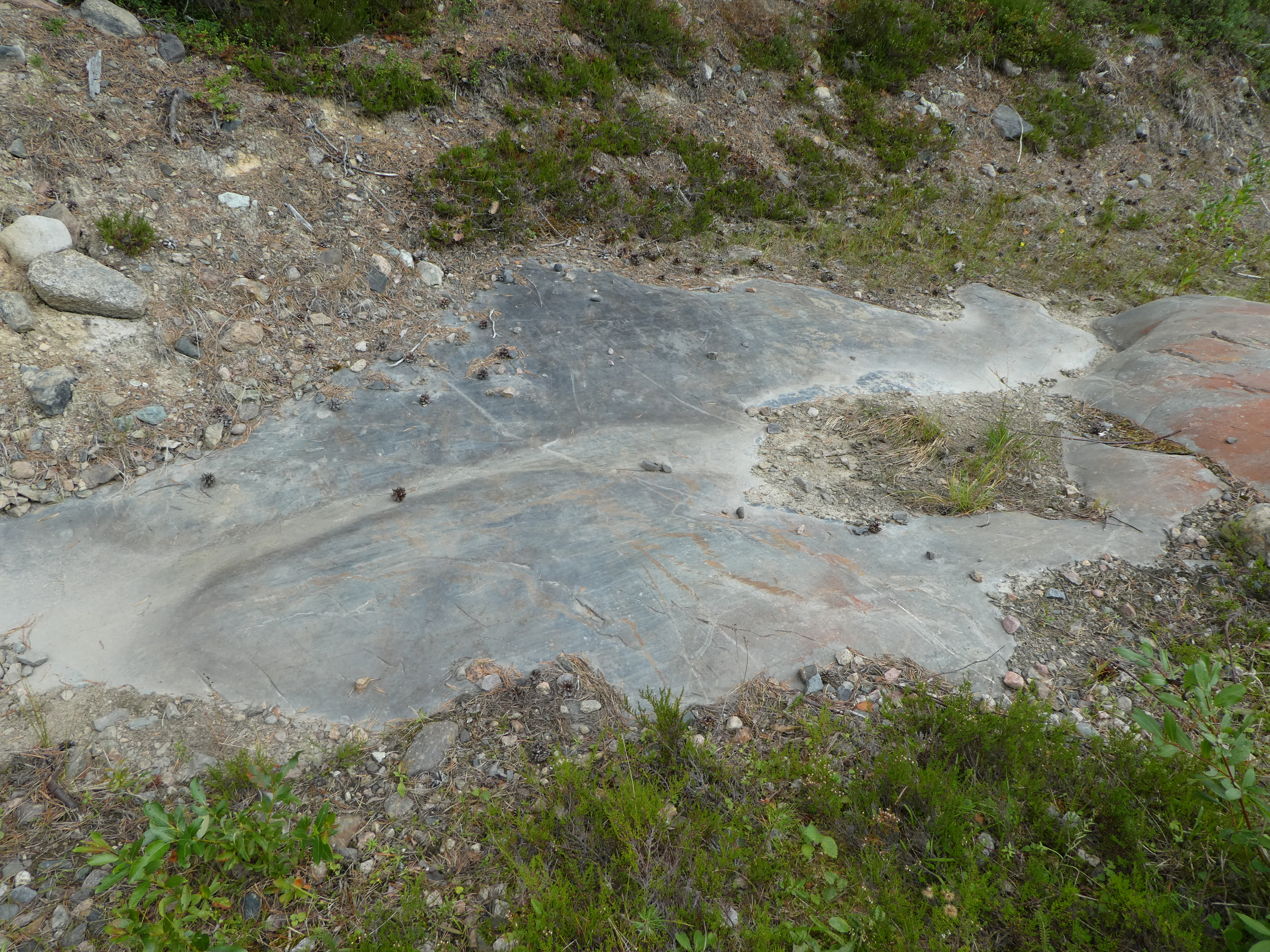
Glacier-polished outcrop of the Jormua Ophiolite.
