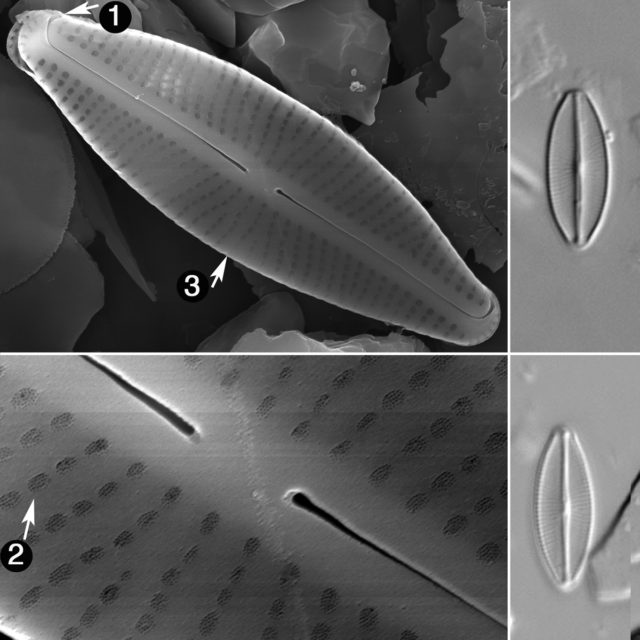

Scientific classification
- Domain: Eukaryota
- Clade: Diaphoretickes
- Clade: SAR
- Clade: Stramenopiles
- Phylum: Gyrista
- Subphylum: Ochrophytina
- Class: Bacillariophyceae
- Order: Cymbellales
- Family: Anomoeoneidaceae
- Genus: Adlafia; Gerd Moser, Lange-Bertalot & Metzeltin, 1998

Species
- 33 Species, see text

= Adlafia =

Genus of single-celled organisms

Adlafia is a genus of diatoms belonging to the family Anomoeoneidaceae.

== Taxonomy ==
As of December 2023, there are 33 accepted species in Adlafia.

- Adlafia aquaeductae (Krasske) Lange-Bertalot, 1998
- Adlafia babeiensis Glushchenko, Kulikovskiy & Kociolek, 2020
- Adlafia baicalensis Kulikovskiy & Lange-Bertalot, 2012
- Adlafia brehmioides (Hustedt) Tremarin & Ludwig, 2017
- Adlafia brockmannii (Hustedt) Bruder & Hinz, 2008
- Adlafia bryophila (J.B.Petersen) Lange-Bertalot, 1998
- Adlafia bryophiloides (Manguin) Van de Vijver, 2002
- Adlafia coringii Metzeltin & Lange-Bertalot, 1998
- Adlafia crispa (Krasske) Tremarin & Ludwig, 2017
- Adlafia dauiensis Glushchenko, Kulikovskiy & Kociolek, 2020
- Adlafia decora Tusset, Tremarin & Ludwig, 2017
- Adlafia detenta (Hustedt) Heudre, C.E.Wetzel & Ector, 2018
- Adlafia diahotensis Le Cohu, Marquié & Tudesque, 2020
- Adlafia drouetiana (R.M.Patrick) Metzeltin & Lange-Bertalot, 1998
- Adlafia frenotii Van der Vijver, Ledeganck & Beyens, 2002
- Adlafia kociolekii Radhakrishnan, Sudipta K.Das, C.E.Wetzel & B.Karthick, 2023
- Adlafia lamdongiensis Glushchenko, Kulikovskiy & Kociolek, 2020
- Adlafia langebertalotii Monnier & Ector, 2012
- Adlafia minuscula (Grunow) Lange-Bertalot, 1999
- Adlafia moseri Marquié, Le Cohu & M.Coste, 2018
- Adlafia multnomahii E.A.Morales & M.Lee, 2005
- Adlafia muscora (Kociolek & Reviers) Gerd Moser, Lange-Bertalot & Metzeltin, 1998
- Adlafia neoniana Cantonati, 2019
- Adlafia parabryophila (Lange-Bertalot) Gerd Moser, Lange-Bertalot & Metzeltin, 1998
- Adlafia pseudobaicalensis Kulikovskiy & Lange-Bertalot, 2012
- Adlafia sinensis B.Liu & D.M.Williams, 2017
- Adlafia submuscora Van de Vijver, Kopalová, Zidarova & E.J.Cox, 2013
- Adlafia suchlandtii (Hustedt) Monnier & Ector, 2012
- Adlafia tellerensis M.E.Benson & Kociolek, 2012
- Adlafia tenuis Van de Vijver & Goeyers, 2019
- Adlafia tjibaoui Le Cohu, Marquié & M.Coste, 2018
- Adlafia triundulata Tusset, Tremarin & Ludwig, 2017
- Adlafia vietnamensis Glushchenko, Kulikovskiy & Kociolek, 2020
- Adlafia wolfei Siver & Velez, 2022

Further species names have been proposed but require further clarification as of December 2023.

- Adlafia paucistriata (H.Z.Zhu & J.Y.Chen) J.Y. Li & Y.Z.Qi U
- Adlafia pseudomuralis (Hustedt) J.Y.Li & Y.Z.Qi U
- Adlafia subbryophila Reavie & N.A.Andresen U

=== Species names brought into synonymy ===
- Adlafia linearis now named Michelcostea lecohuiana, also in the Anomoeoneidaceae.
- Adlafia besarensis is an invalid name of Petroneis besarensis in the Lyrellaceae.
