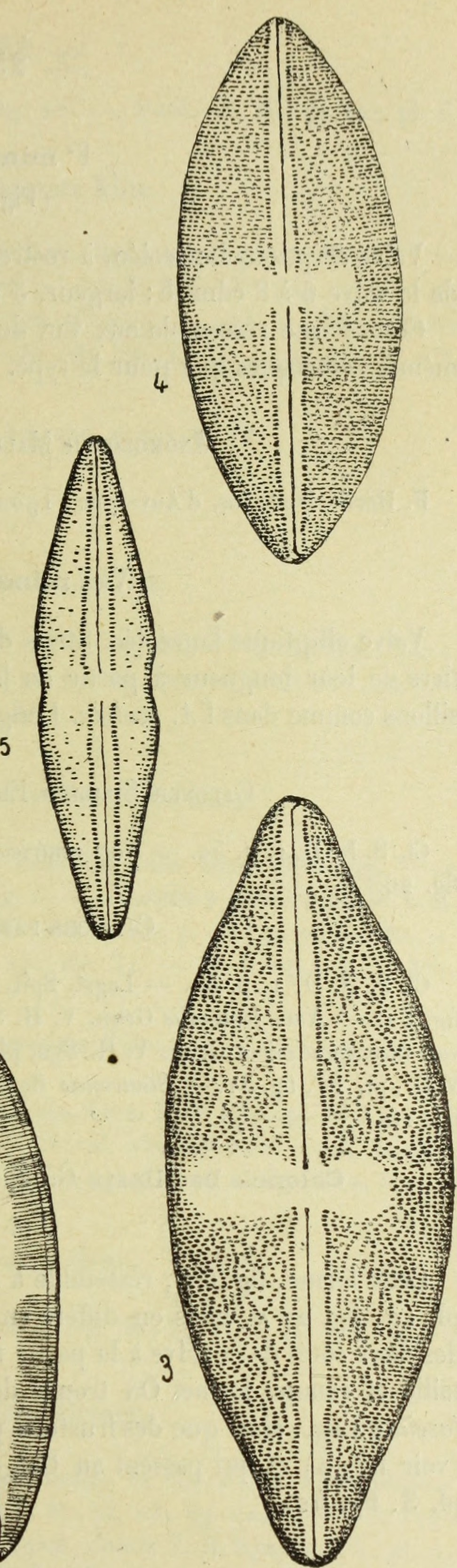
- 3. Anomoeoneis (sphaerophora var.) Mangini nov. ×850; - 4. id. fa minor nov. × 850; - 5. Anomoeoneis sphaeophora status auxosporeus O'Mul. var. constricta nov. ×850

Scientific classification
- Domain: Eukaryota
- Clade: Diaphoretickes
- Clade: SAR
- Clade: Stramenopiles
- Phylum: Gyrista
- Subphylum: Ochrophytina
- Class: Bacillariophyceae
- Order: Cymbellales
- Family: Anomoeoneidaceae
- Genus: Anomoeoneis; Pfitzer, 1871

= Anomoeoneis =

Genus of algae

Anomoeoneis is a genus of diatoms belonging to the family Anomoeoneidaceae.

== Taxonomy ==
As of December 2023, Algaebase lists 19 accepted species:

- Anomoeoneis atacamensis Frenguelli
- Anomoeoneis capitata
- Anomoeoneis concreta
- Anomoeoneis costata
- Anomoeoneis elliptica
- Anomoeoneis exellii
- Anomoeoneis fogedii
- Anomoeoneis inconcinna
- Anomoeoneis kolbei
- Anomoeoneis lanceolata
- Anomoeoneis macdonaghii
- Anomoeoneis monoensis
- Anomoeoneis polygramma
- Anomoeoneis punae
- Anomoeoneis rhomboidea
- Anomoeoneis santapaui
- Anomoeoneis sculpta
- Anomoeoneis sphaerophora
- Anomoeoneis undulata

As of December 2023, Algaebase further lists 6 Species with unclear taxonomic status:

- Anomoeoneis bicapitata G.W.Andrews
- Anomoeoneis bohemica (Ehrenberg) Pfitzer
- Anomoeoneis canadensis
- Anomoeoneis gomphonemacea
- Anomoeoneis manginii
- Anomoeoneis microcephala
