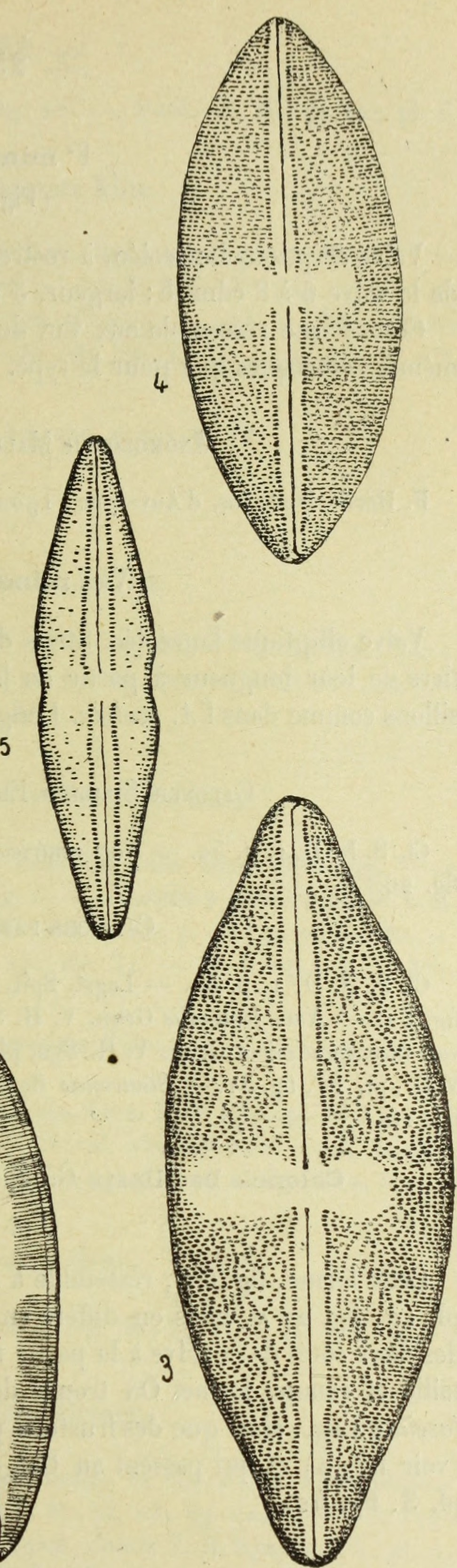
- 3. Anomoeoneis (sphaerophora var.) Mangini nov. ×850; - 4. id. fa minor nov. × 850; - 5. Anomoeoneis sphaeophora status auxosporeus O'Mul. var. constricta nov. ×850

Scientific classification
- Domain: Eukaryota
- Clade: Sar
- Clade: Stramenopiles
- Division: Ochrophyta
- Clade: Bacillariophyta
- Class: Bacillariophyceae
- Order: Cymbellales
- Family: Anomoeoneidaceae
- Genus: Anomoeoneis
- Species: A. sphaerophora

Binomial name
- Anomoeoneis sphaerophora Pfitzer, 1871

Synonyms
- Navicula amphisbaena var. sphaerophora (Kützing) Rabenhorst 1846; Navicula sphaerophora Kützing 1844; Schizonema sphaeophorum (Pfitzer) Kuntze 1898

= Anomoeoneis sphaerophora =

Species of single-celled organism

Anomoeoneis sphaerophora is a species of diatom belonging to the family Anomoeoneidaceae.

It has cosmopolitan distribution.
