= Étang de Lers =

French lake

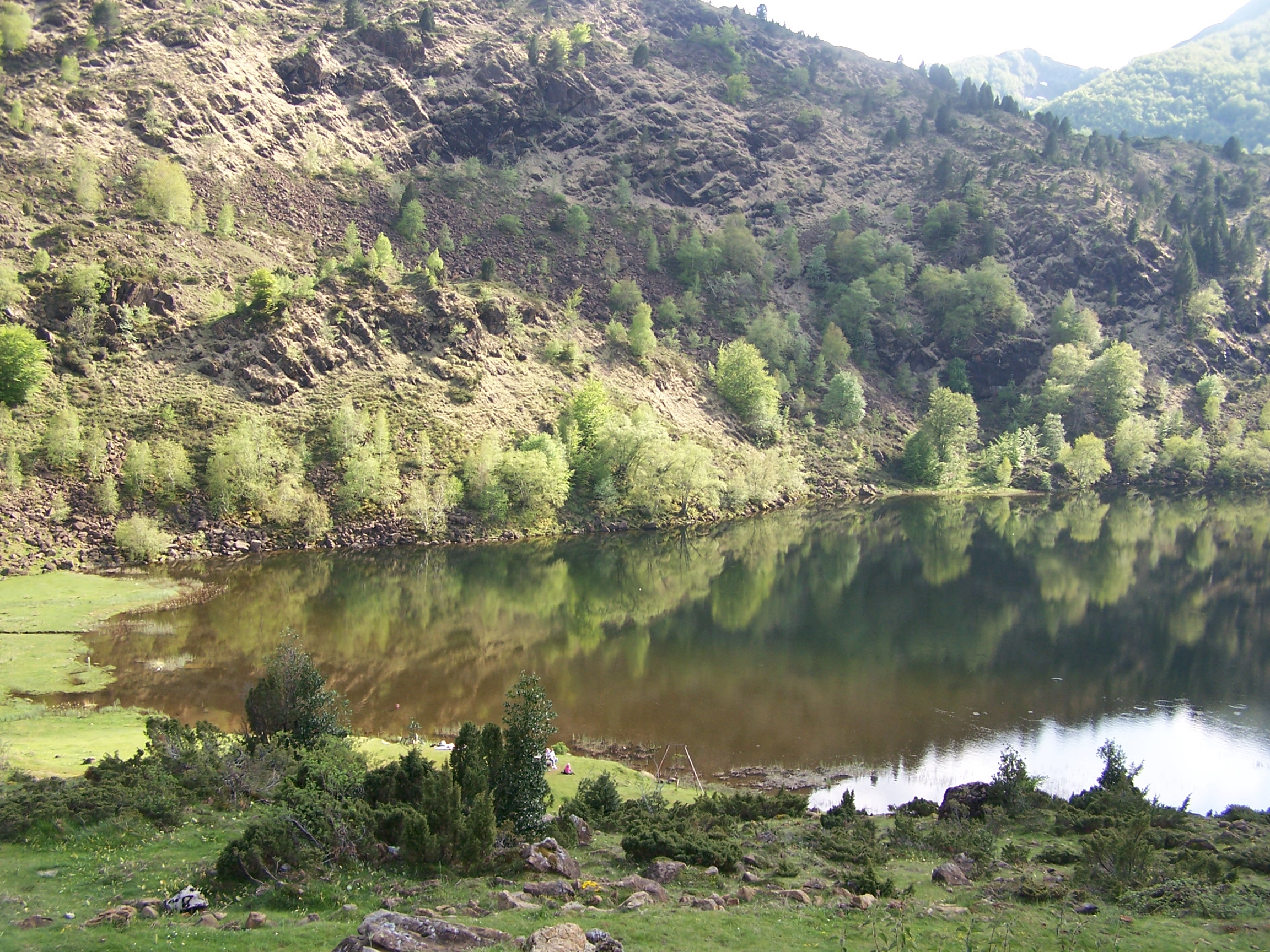

- Location within France
- Coordinates: 42°48′27″N 1°22′40″E
- Lake type: Natural
- Surface elevation: 1,264 m (4,147 ft)

Étang de Lers or Lake of Lers is a natural lake in the Ariège department (France).

== Geology ==
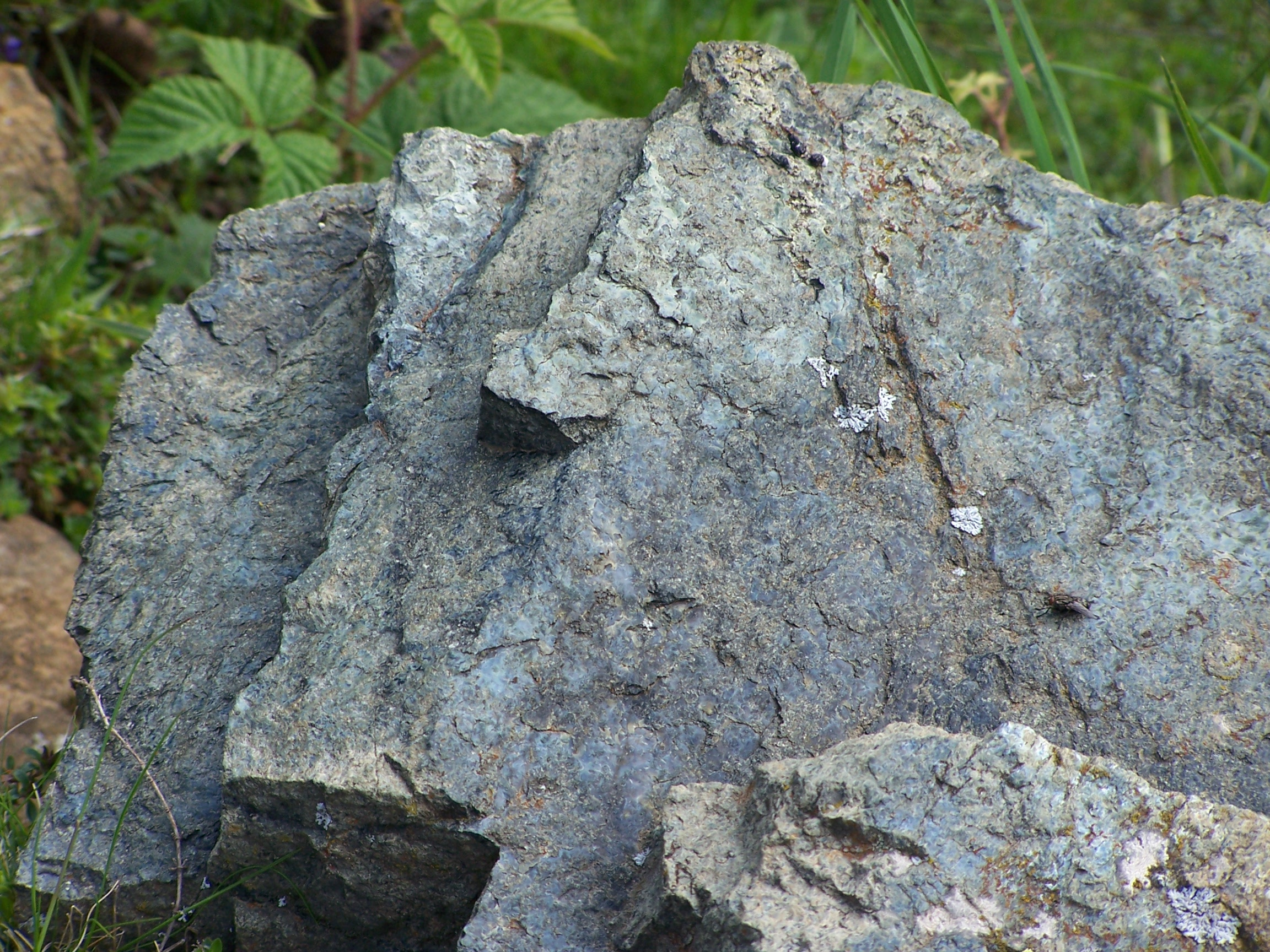
A Lherzolite from Lers.

Lherzolite, an ultramafic rock, has its type locality at Étang de Lers. The name is derived from the old spelling "Étang de Lherz".
