= Gharyan volcanic field =

African volcanic field

- Location within Libya

Highest point
- Elevation: 850 m (2,790 ft)
- Coordinates: 32°N 13.25°E

Gharyan volcanic field is a volcanic field in northwestern Libya, with the towns of Bani Walid, Gharyan, Mizdah and Tarhunah close by.

Gharyan is one among several intraplate volcanic fields in Africa, which include Haruj, Hoggar, Jebel Marra and Tibesti. They are linked either with crustal domes or rifts and appear to be the consequence of lithosphere-mantle processes such as mantle plumes. Haruj and Wau en Namus in Libya may be still active.

The field has covered an area of about 3,000 square kilometres (1,200 sq mi) with lava domes, lava flows and volcanic cones such as the shield volcanoes Ras el-Mohor and Ras Tebra. Exposed laccoliths are also common in some parts of the field, such as Kaf El Khalef, Kaf El Tekut, Kaf Mantrus, Kaf el-Tuam and Ras Tuint-Rabib. The location of these vents appears to be controlled by a neighbouring graben and tectonic fractures. The volcanic field developed on a basement formed by Mesozoic limestones.

The field has erupted basanite and phonolite with a total volume of about 350 cubic kilometres (84 cu mi), additional volcanic rocks are basaltic andesite, hawaiite and tephrite. Basaltic rocks range from alkali basalt to tholeiite.

Potassium-argon dating has yielded an age of about 12 to 1 million years ago for the field; activity commenced in the Eocene with the basaltic plateau and continued in the late Eocene and later with lava domes and individual volcanoes. Volcanic activity has been subdivided in several separate cycles.
