= Dickieia =

Scientific classification
- Domain: Eukaryota
- Clade: Diaphoretickes
- Clade: SAR
- Clade: Stramenopiles
- Phylum: Gyrista
- Subphylum: Ochrophytina
- Class: Bacillariophyceae
- Order: Cymbellales
- Family: Anomoeoneidaceae
- Genus: Dickieia; Berkeley ex Kützing, 1844

Species
- Dickieia excepta (VanLandingham) D.G.Mann 1994; Dickieia legleri (Hustedt) Clavero & Hernández-Mariné 2012; Dickieia pinnata Ralfs 1851; Dickieia resistans Witkowski, Lange-Bertalot & Metzeltin 2000; Dickieia subinflata (Grunow) D.G.Mann 1994; Dickieia ulvacea Berkeley ex Kützing 1844; Dickieia wajdae Witkowski, Lange-Bertalot & Metzeltin 2000

Genus of single-celled organisms

Dickieia is a genus of diatoms belonging to the family Anomoeoneidaceae.

== Taxonomy ==
As of December 2023, there are 7 accepted species in Dickieia. Further species names have been proposed but require further clarification as of December 2023.

- Dickieia soodensis (Krasske) E.Reichardt
- Dickieia ulvoides Berkeley & Ralfs 1844

=== Species names brought into synonymy ===
- Dickieia crucigera now named Haslea crucigera in the Naviculaceae.
- Dickieia danseyi now named Mastogloia danseyi in the Mastogloiaceae.
