= Jormua =

Village in Kajaani, Finland

Coordinates: 64°17′39″N 028°00′53″E

Jormua is an old village on the shore of the lake of Oulujärvi in the town of Kajaani, Finland. The village has a population of about 750. The Jormua Ophiolite is named after the village.
