= Fezzan Basin =

Interior drainage basin in Libya

The Fazzan Basin, or Fezzan Basin, is a large endorheic basin in Libya. It has no outlet to the sea and contains large areas of desert or semi-arid land. It is one of two basins in southern Libya on the northern flanks of the Tibesti Mountains in the central Sahara desert, the other being the Kufra Basin, further to the east.

== Formation ==
The Fazzan Basin is situated on the junction between two tectonic plates. Collision between these occurred in the Paleozoic period and caused thickening of the Earth's crust, which then downwarped under its own weight to form a depression in the ground, the Fazzan Basin. Since then, there has been a deposition of "continental intercalaire" and other continental rocks, and large quantities of water have been trapped in underground aquifers. An outcrop of basalt occurs between the Fazzan and the Kufra Basins, and both are overlaid by sand.

The climate of this region has varied greatly in the past, with pluvial and dry periods alternating; the current arid phase averages less than 20 mm (0.8 in) of precipitation per year. During its geologic history, the Fazzan Basin has on at least four occasions during the Pleistocene been inundated with water to form a large lake. On each occasion, a thick layer of limestone was deposited. Armitage et al. (2007) estimated that two of these events occurred earlier than 400,000 years ago, another one was in MIS 11 (~400,000 years ago) and a further one in MIS 5 (between 130,000 and 80,000 years ago). Geye and Thiedig (2008) recognise further lake sedimentation periods in MIS 9 and MIS 7. They have also estimated that the lake extended to 100,000 km^{2} (38,610 mi^{2}) in MIS 11, and this was when it was at its maximum size. By MIS 5, the lake was reduced to 1,400 km^{2} (541 mi^{2}) and less than 100 km^{2} (39 mi^{2}) during the most recent iteration in the Holocene. However, Armitage et al. (2007), citing Brooks et al. (2003), put the Holocene lake area at 76,250 km^{2} (29,440 mi^{2}). Although there is some disagreement about the exact timing and the size of Lake Megafazzan, both authorities agree that there has been no lacustrine activity between MIS 5 and the Holocene. The MIS 5 deposits include fossils of Cerastoderma glaucum, which indicates that the water was probably brackish.

== Lake Megafazzan ==
During the Miocene, Libya was drained by two large rivers systems, both flowing into the Mediterranean Sea, the Wadi Nashu River in the west and the Sahabi River in the centre and east. In the late Miocene and early Messinian, increased volcanic activity in northeastern Libya resulted in the damming back of the Wadi Nashu, which caused water to accumulate in the Fazzan Basin, forming the proto-Lake Megafazzan during humid periods.
