= Halamphora veneta =

Scientific classification
- Domain: Eukaryota
- Clade: Sar
- Clade: Stramenopiles
- Division: Ochrophyta
- Clade: Bacillariophyta
- Class: Bacillariophyceae
- Order: Surirellales
- Family: Surirellaceae
- Genus: Halamphora
- Species: H. veneta

Binomial name
- Halamphora veneta (Kützing) Levkov

Species of single-celled organism

Halamphora veneta is a species of diatom belonging to the family Surirellaceae.
