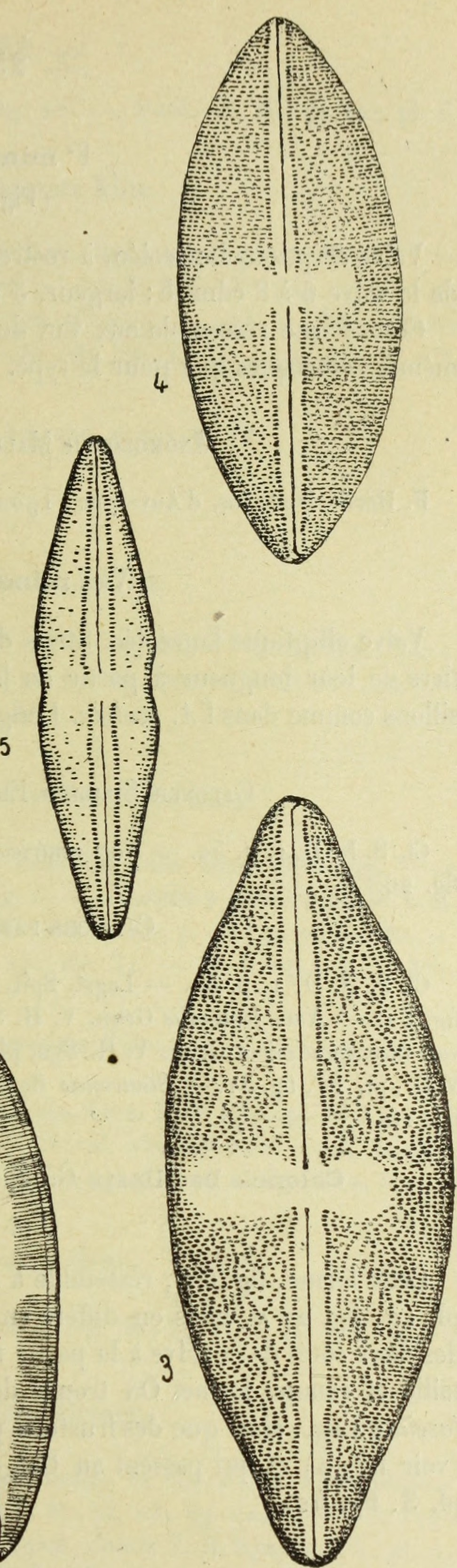
- Anomoeoneis sphaeophora

Scientific classification
- Domain: Eukaryota
- Clade: Diaphoretickes
- Clade: SAR
- Clade: Stramenopiles
- Phylum: Gyrista
- Subphylum: Ochrophytina
- Class: Bacillariophyceae
- Order: Cymbellales
- Family: Anomoeoneidaceae; D.G.Mann, 1990

= Anomoeoneidaceae =

Family of algae

Anomoeoneidaceae is a family of diatoms belonging to the order Cymbellales.

== Taxonomy ==
As of December 2023, there are 6 genera described in the Anomoeoneidaceae, including 80 accepted species.

- Adlafia
- Anomoeoneis
- Dickieia
- Michelcostea
- Pauliella
- Staurophora
