= Lherz Massif =

Lherz Massif is an upper mantle peridotite body in the French Pyrenees. The rock lherzolite takes its name from this rock body.
