= Upper mantle body =

Geological region

An upper mantle body is a geological region where upper mantle rocks (peridotite) outcrop on the surface of the Earth (including the ocean floor).

Upper mantle outcrops include:

- upper mantle made at constructive plate boundaries, but preserved in ophiolites, for example Isabela ophiolite in the Philippines
- upper mantle above subduction zones, so called suprasubduction ophiolites (such as Troodos Ophiolite, Cyprus)
- upper mantle exposed by thinning of continental crust by extension to continental crust removal (Ligurian "Ophiolites" and conjugate margin of Iberia and Newfoundland)
- upper mantle exposures on earth's surface above sea-water level in Oceans (whose ocean floor is covered with oceanic crust). Examples are Macquarie Island in the Pacific and the St. Peter and St. Paul Islands in the Atlantic.
- upper mantle exposures on earth's surface on the ocean floor. Examples include Gakkel Ridge and Lena Trough.
- upper mantle exposures on earth's surface of disputed origin
- upper mantle exposure on earth's surface of not understood environment
