= Harzburgite =

Type of peridotite with less than 5% clinopyroxene and less than 90% olivine.

- Igneous rock
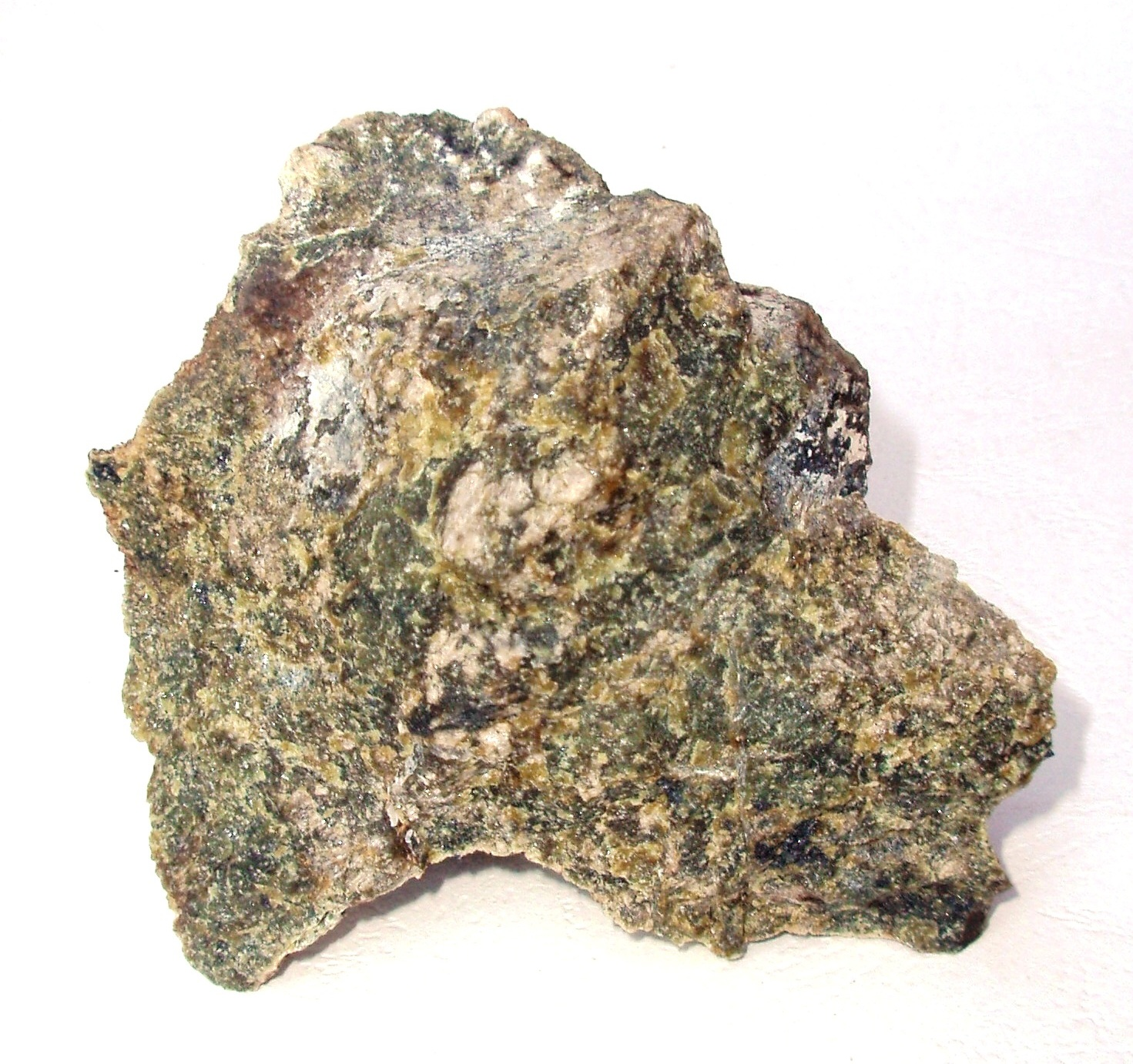
- Harzburgite from a small intrusion 35 km south of Ambositra, Madagascar

Composition
- Classification: Ultramafic
- Primary: olivine and orthopyroxene
- Secondary: clinopyroxene, hornblende, spinel, garnet, anorthite, bytownite
- Texture: Phaneritic

Harzburgite, an ultramafic, igneous rock, is a variety of peridotite consisting mostly of the two minerals olivine and low-calcium (Ca) pyroxene (enstatite); it is named for occurrences in the Harz Mountains of Germany. It commonly contains a few percent chromium-rich spinel as an accessory mineral. Garnet-bearing harzburgite is much less common, found most commonly as xenoliths in kimberlite.

Harzburgite typically forms by the extraction of partial melts from the more pyroxene-rich peridotite called lherzolite. The molten magma extracted from harzburgite may then erupt on the surface as basalt. If partial melting of the harzburgite continues, all of the pyroxene may be extracted from it to form magma, leaving behind the pyroxene-poor peridotite called dunite. Harzburgite may also form by the accumulation of olivine and low-Ca pyroxene in large magma chambers of basalt deep in continental crust (layered intrusions).

== Occurrence ==
Harzburgite is the most commonly found variety of peridotite in ophiolites, which are fragments of oceanic crust and the underlying oceanic mantle obducted and exposed during collision with continental crust. Examples of ophiolites with extensive harzburgite include the Troodos Ophiolite in Cyprus, the Semail Ophiolite in Oman, the Coast Range ophiolites of California, and the Bay of Islands Ophiolite in Newfoundland.

Harzburgite may also be found in some Alpine peridotite massifs that consist mostly of lherzolite. Alpine or orogenic lherzolites represent subcontinental mantle lithosphere (the upper mantle below continental crust) exposed during the plate tectonic collision of continental plates. Examples of orogenic lherzolite massifs with harzburgite include the Lherz Massif in France (Pyrenees Mountains), the Lanzo Massif in northern Italy, and the Horoman Massif in Japan.

Garnet-bearing harzburgite is found as xenoliths in some kimberlite pipes, which are found almost exclusively in ancient continental cratons of Archean or Paleoproterozoic age. The mantle lithosphere under these cratons is particularly thick (up to 200 km or more) and cool. Garnet harzburgites are less depleted in the basalt component than most ophiolite harzburgites. Garnet harzburgite xenoliths from kimberlites in South Africa have been particularly well-characterized.

Cumulate harzburgite is found in some large layered igneous intrusions. At the Earth's surface, basaltic magmas typically crystallize the minerals: olivine, plagioclase, and augite (a high-Ca pyroxene); low-Ca pyroxenes can only co-exist with olivine at low pressure in magma that is high in both MgO and SiO_{2} (boninites). At pressures greater than 5 kilobars (0.5 GPa, or 5000x atmospheric pressure), olivine and low-Ca pyroxene (enstatite or bronzite) may crystallize together from normal basalt magmas to form harzburgite. These conditions were common in some layered mafic intrusions, most of which are Proterozoic in age, which formed from enormous sill-like intrusions of basalt into lower continental crust. The classic example of a Proterozoic layered intrusion with cumulate harzburgite is the Stillwater igneous complex of Montana, U.S.A. It is also found in the Bushveld Igneous Complex, a large layered intrusion in South Africa.
