= Lherzolite =

Type of igneous rock

- Igneous rock
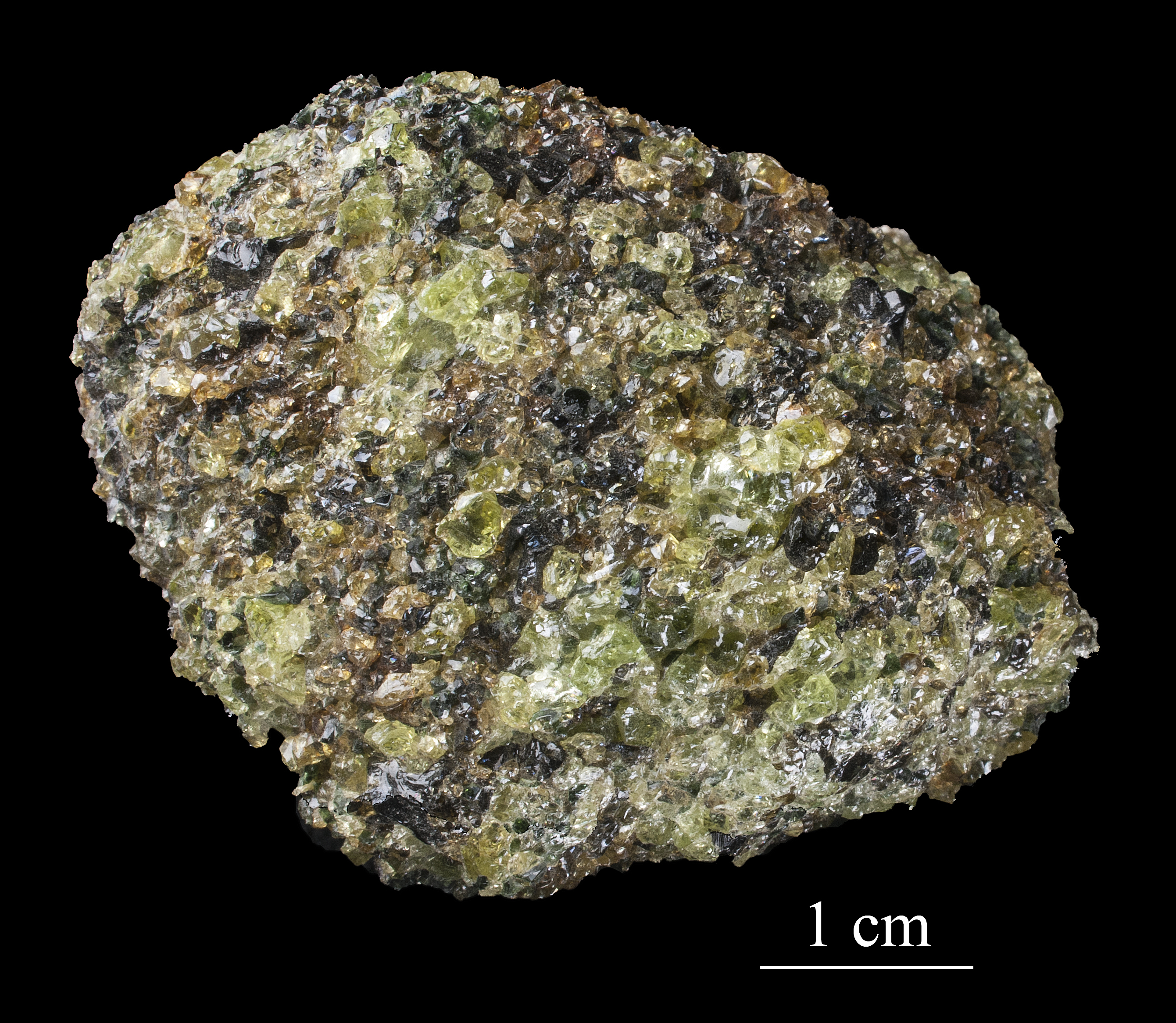
- Lherzolite

Composition
- Classification: Ultramafic
- Primary: olivine, orthopyroxene, and clinopyroxene
- Secondary: hornblende, spinel, garnet, anorthite, bytownite, maskelynite
- Texture: Phaneritic

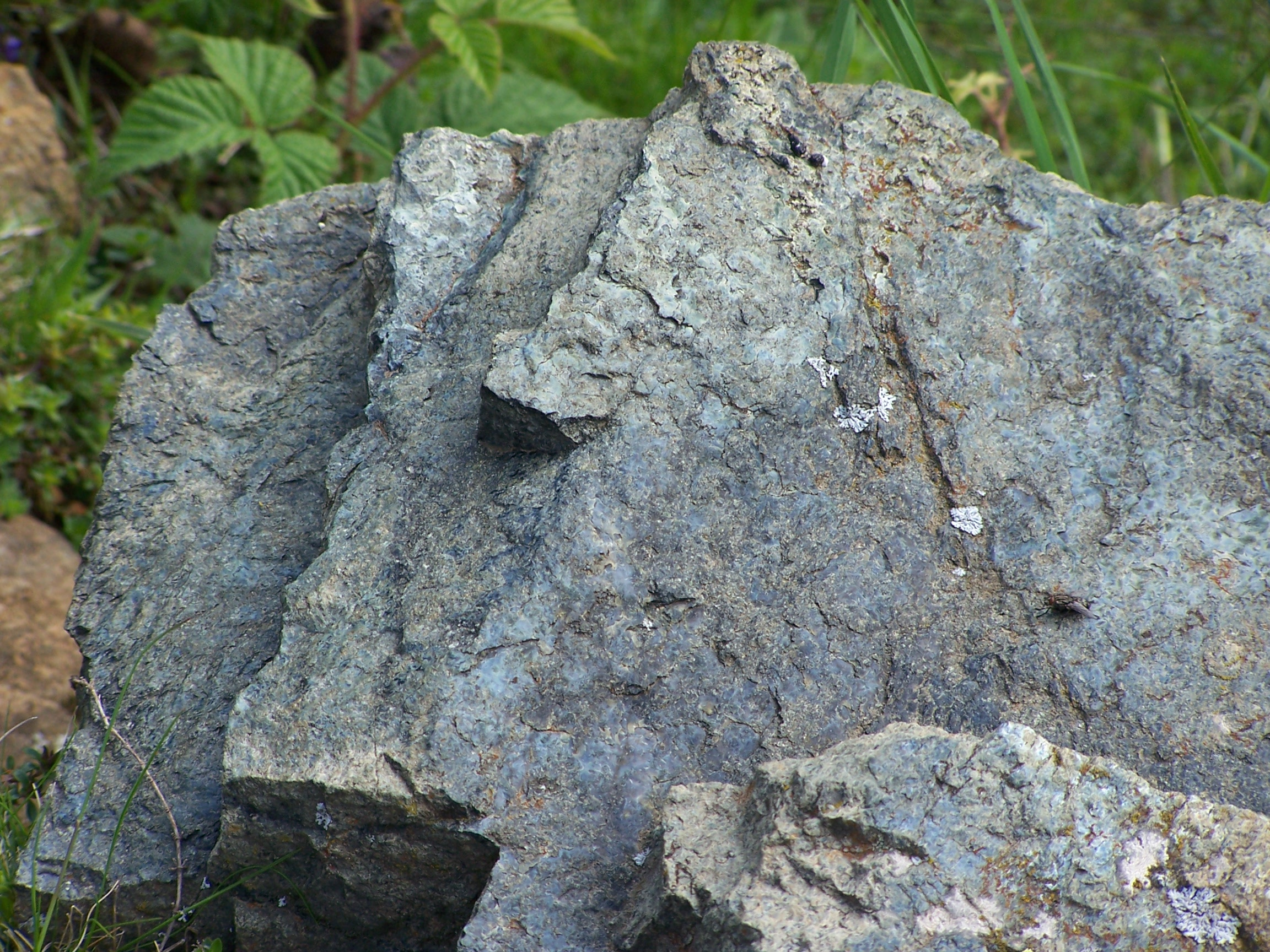
Lherzolite at Etang de Lers, Ariège, France

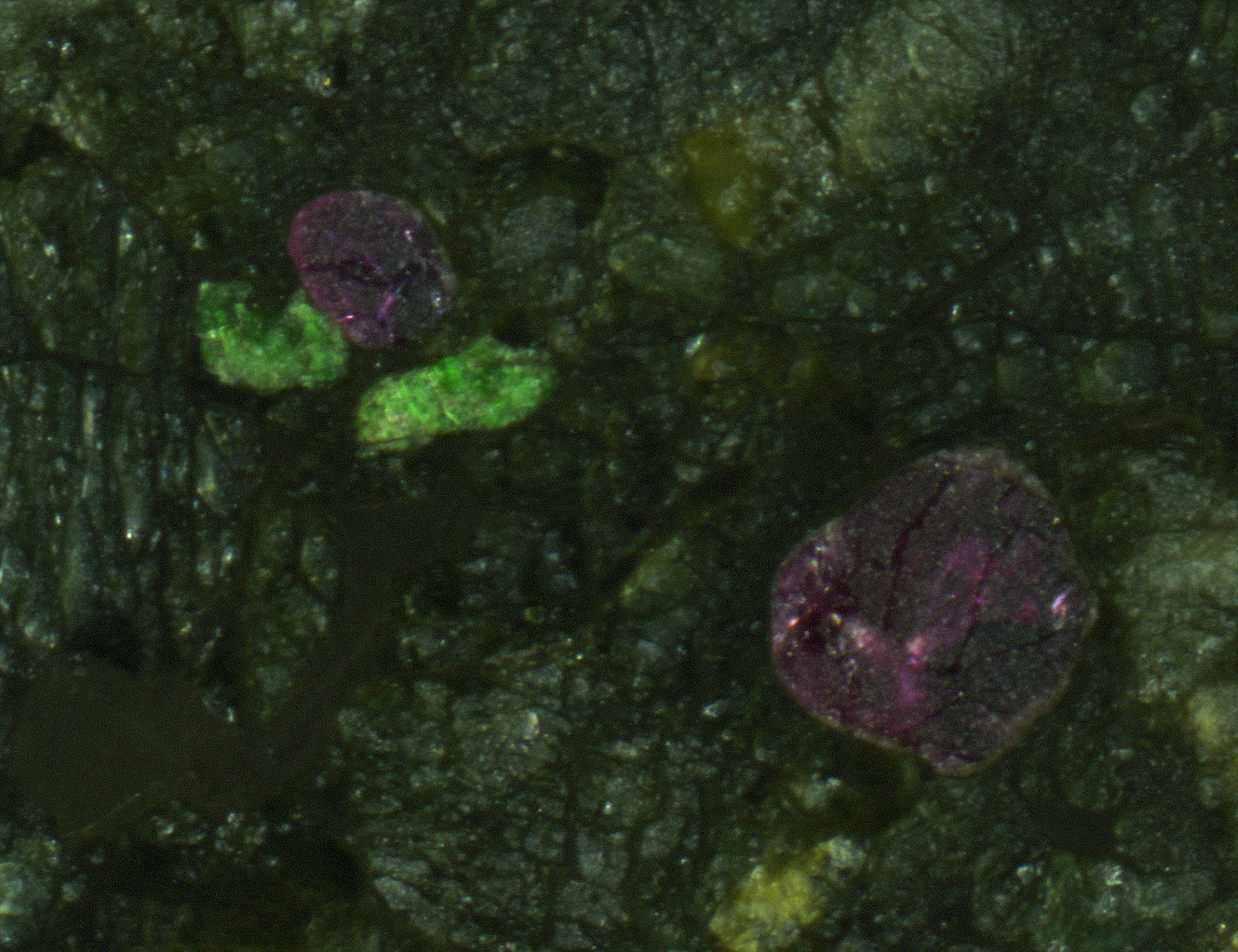
Garnet lherzolite, a xenolith from a kimberlite pipe, Kimberley, South Africa. Field of view ~1.6 cm across. Purplish red = pyrope garnet. Bright green = chromian diopside. Dark greenish-black = orthopyroxene. Olive-green = olivine.

Lherzolite is a type of peridotite. It is a coarse-grained rock consisting of 40 to 90% olivine along with significant orthopyroxene and lesser amounts of calcic chromium-rich clinopyroxene. Minor minerals include chromium and aluminium spinels and garnets. Plagioclase can occur in lherzolites and other peridotites that crystallize at relatively shallow depths (20 – 30 km). At greater depth plagioclase is unstable and is replaced by spinel. At approximately 90 km depth, pyrope garnet becomes the stable aluminous phase. Garnet lherzolite is a major constituent of the Earth's upper mantle (extending to ~300 km depth). Lherzolite is known from the lower ultramafic part of ophiolite complexes (although harzburgite is more common in this setting), from alpine-type peridotite massifs, from fracture zones adjacent to mid-oceanic ridges, and as xenoliths in kimberlite pipes and alkali basalts. Partial melting of spinel lherzolite is one of the primary sources of basaltic magma. Lherzolite can also form as cumulates within layered intrusions.

The name is derived from its type locality, the Lherz Massif (an alpine peridotite complex, also known as orogenic lherzolite complex), at Étang de Lers, near Massat in the French Pyrenees; Étang de Lherz is the archaic spelling of this location.

The Lherz massif also contains harzburgite and dunite, as well as layers of spinel pyroxenite, garnet pyroxenite, and hornblendite. The layers represent partial melts extracted from the host peridotite during decompression in the mantle long before emplacement into the crust.

The Lherz massif is unique because it has been emplaced into Paleozoic carbonates (limestones and dolomites), which form mixed breccias of limestone-lherzolite around the margins of the massif.

The Moon's lower mantle may be composed of lherzolite.

== Lherzolitic shergottites ==
Lherzolitic shergottites are a rare subclass of Martian meteorites within the shergottite group. Named for their mineralogical similarity to terrestrial lherzolite rocks, these specimens are coarse-grained, primitive magmatic rocks that originated deep within the subsurface of Mars. They represent some of the most mafic components of Martian magmatism discovered on Earth.

=== Mineralogy and texture ===
Lherzolitic shergottites are characterized by a distinct poikilitic-to-non-poikilitic texture. The primary rock-forming minerals include:

- Olivine: Typically making up 50% to 55% of the total volume.
- Pyroxene: Comprising roughly 35% of the volume, consisting of both low-Ca (pigeonite) and high-Ca (augite) varieties.
- Maskelynite: A shock-melted plagioclase feldspar glass (roughly 5% to 8%) resulting from the impact event that ejected the rock from Mars.

Accessory minerals commonly include chromite, ilmenite, and calcium phosphates such as merrillite.

=== Impact metamorphism ===
Due to the high-energy impact required to achieve escape velocity from the Martian gravitational field, all known lherzolitic shergottites exhibit signs of severe shock metamorphism. This includes extensive fracture networks, the formation of localized melt pockets, and the complete transformation of crystalline plagioclase into maskelynite. High-pressure mineral phases such as stishovite and tuite (γ-Ca_{3}(PO_{4})_{2}) are often found inside these shock-melt zones.

=== Notable specimens ===
- ALHA77005: Found in the Allan Hills of Antarctica in 1977, this was the first meteorite classified under this group.
- LEW 88516: A 13.2-gram specimen found in the Lewis Cliffs region that shares almost identical ejection timelines with ALHA77005.
- NWA 1950: Discovered in the Moroccan Atlas Mountains in 2001, providing researchers with larger, non-Antarctic mass profiles to study.

== Lherzolites on asteroid 4 Vesta ==
Geochemical analyses have identified a suite of unbrecciated ultramafic meteorites such as NWA 12217, NWA 12319, and NWA 12562 as lherzolite and dunite cumulates from the deep crust or upper mantle of the asteroid 4 Vesta (or a highly similar differentiated protoplanet). Historically, the Howardite-Eucrite-Diogenite (HED) suite provided samples of Vesta's upper volcanic basaltic crust (eucrites) and lower crustal orthopyroxenites (diogenites), leaving a "missing mantle problem" regarding the asteroid's predicted olivine-rich interior.

These Vestan lherzolite cumulates consist primarily of magnesium-rich olivine alongside orthopyroxene and minor clinopyroxene, representing crystal settling from an early Vestan magma ocean. High-precision oxygen (Δ¹⁷O) and chromium (ε⁵⁴Cr) isotopic fingerprints match the HED suite, while highly depleted siderophile element concentrations confirm these lherzolites formed after core segregation was complete on the parent body.
