= Peridotite =

Coarse-grained ultramafic igneous rock

- Igneous rock
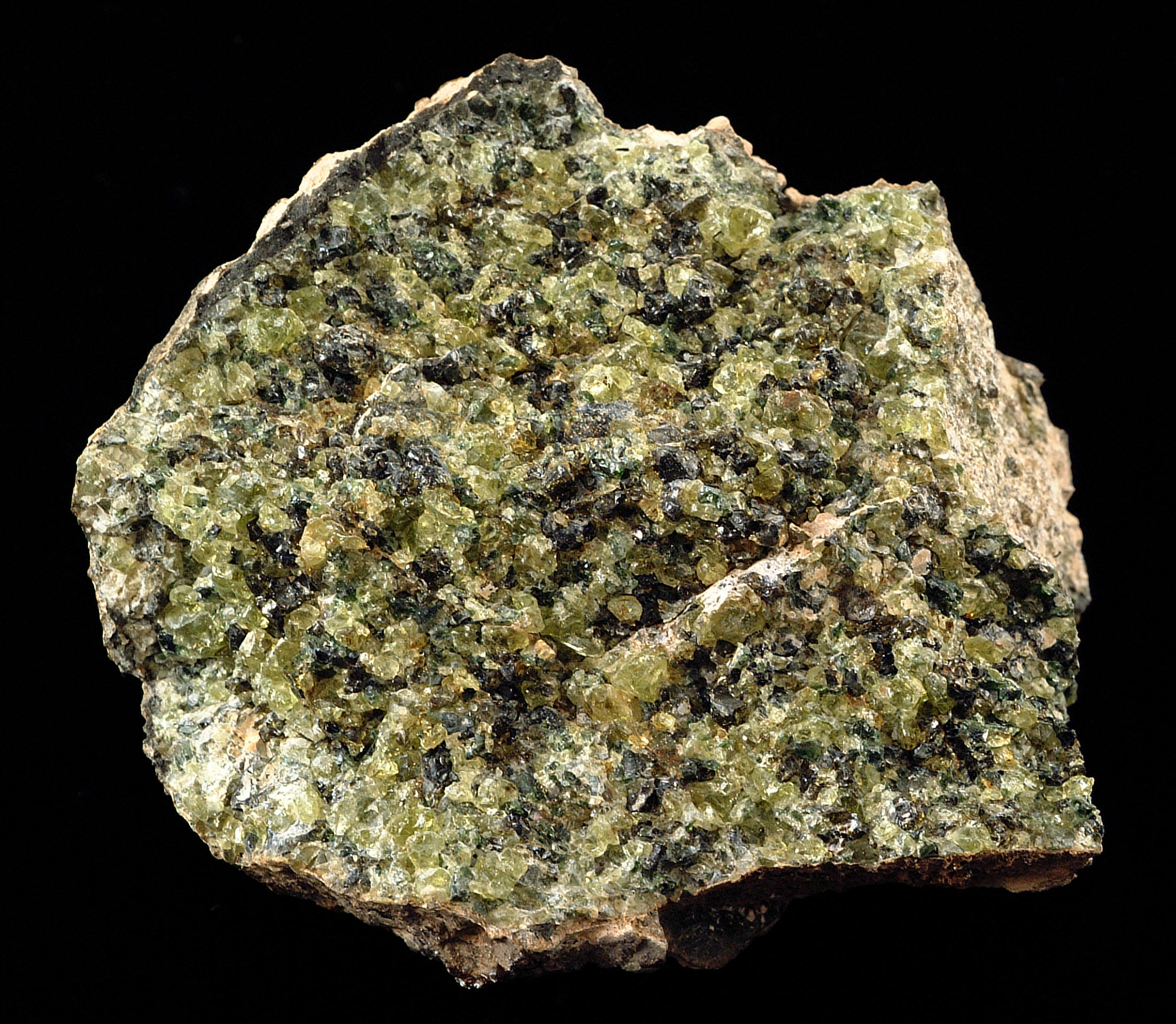
- Peridotite xenolith from the Kilbourne Hole maar, New Mexico.

Composition
- Classification: ultramafic
- Primary: olivine
- Secondary: orthopyroxene, clinopyroxene, hornblende, spinel, chromite, garnet, anorthite, bytownite, maskelynite
- Texture: Phaneritic

Peridotite (US: /ˈpɛrɪdoʊˌtaɪt, pəˈrɪdə-/ PERR-ih-doh-tyte, pə-RID-ə-) is a dense, phaneritic (coarse-grained) igneous rock consisting mostly of the silicate minerals olivine and pyroxene. Peridotite is ultramafic, as the rock contains less than 45% silica. It is high in magnesium (Mg^{2+}), reflecting the high proportions of magnesium-rich olivine, with appreciable iron. Peridotite is derived from Earth's mantle, either as solid blocks and fragments, or as crystals accumulated from magmas that formed in the mantle. The compositions of peridotites from these layered igneous complexes vary widely, reflecting the relative proportions of pyroxenes, chromite, plagioclase, and amphibole.

Peridotite is the dominant rock of the upper part of Earth's mantle. The compositions of peridotite xenoliths found in certain basalts are of special interest along with kimberlite pipe (kimberlite), because they provide samples of Earth's mantle brought up from depths ranging from about 30 km to 200 km or more. Some of the xenoliths preserve isotope ratios of osmium and other elements that record processes that occurred when Earth was formed, and so they are of special interest to paleogeologists because they provide clues to the early composition of Earth's upper mantle and the complexities of the processes that occurred.

The word peridotite comes from the gemstone peridot, which consists of pale green forsterite (olivine). Peridotite is typically bright green with some specks of black or brown, although most hand samples tend to be darker green. Peridotitic outcrops typically range from earthy bright yellow to dark green; this is because olivine is easily weathered to iddingsite. While green and yellow are the most common colors, peridotitic rocks may exhibit a wide range of colors including blue, brown, and red.

== Classification ==
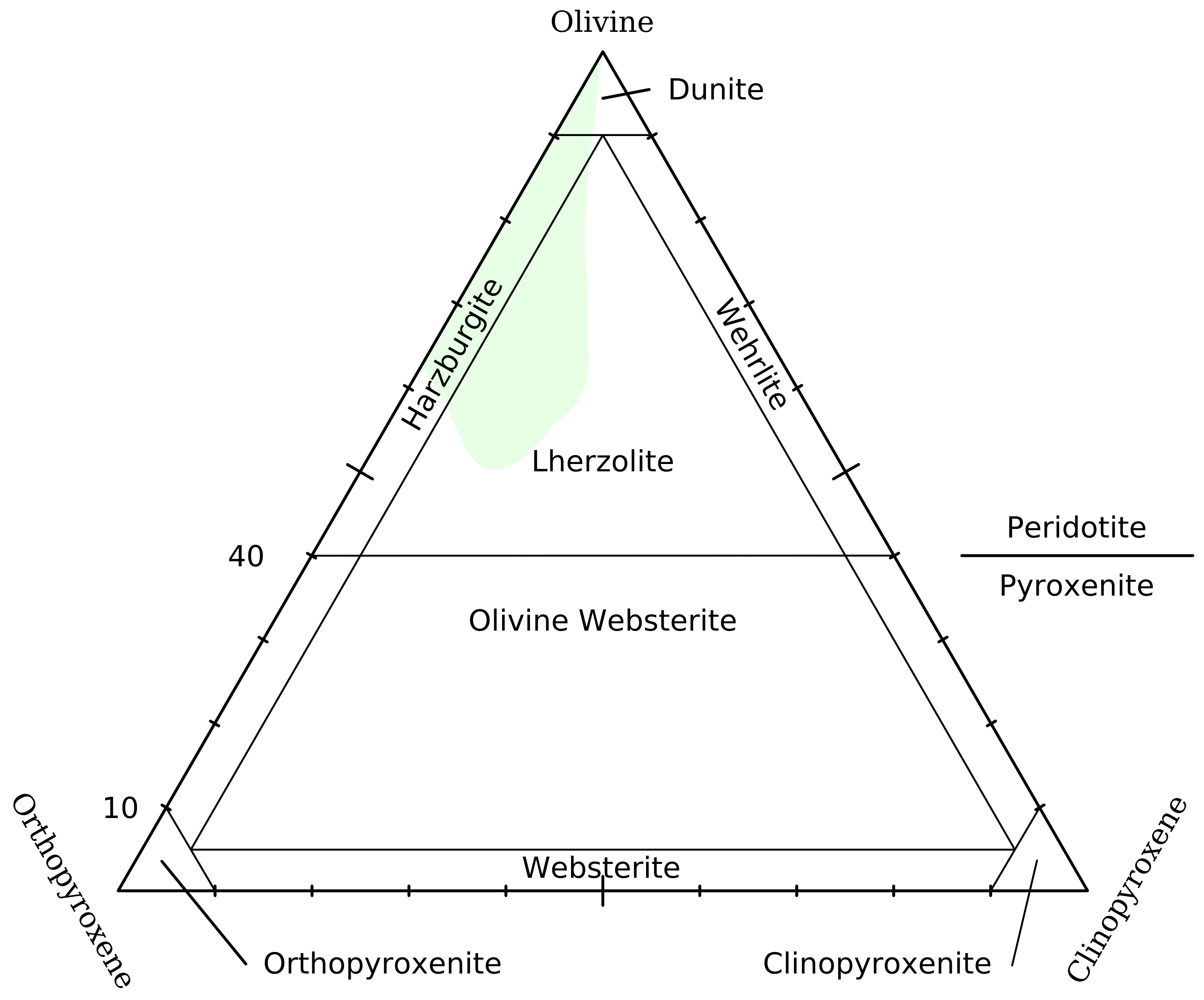
Classification diagram for peridotite and pyroxenite, based on proportions of olivine and pyroxene. The pale green area encompasses the most common compositions of peridotite in the upper part of the Earth's mantle (partly adapted from Bodinier and Godard (2004)).

Igneous rocks rich in magnesium and iron with a color index greater than 90 are defined as ultramafic. Ultramafic rocks may be further classified by their relative proportions of olivine, orthopyroxene, clinopyroxene, and hornblende, which are the most abundant families of mafic minerals in most ultramafic rocks. Peridotite is then defined as coarse-grained ultramafic rock in which olivine makes up 40% or more of the total volume of these four mineral families in the rock.

Peridotites are further classified as follows:

- Dunite: more than 90% olivine, less than 10% of pyroxenes and/or hornblende
  Dunite is found as prominent veins in the peridotite layer of ophiolites, which are interpreted as slices of oceanic lithosphere (crust and upper mantle) thrust onto continents. Dunite also occurs as a cumulate in layered intrusions, where olivine crystallized out of a slowly cooling body of magma and accumulated on the floor of the magma body to form the lowest layer of the intrusion. Dunite almost always contains accessory chromite.
- Kimberlite: formed in volcanic pipes and at least 35% olivine
  Kimberlite is a highly brecciated variant of peridotite formed in volcanic pipes and is known for being the host rock to diamonds. Unlike other forms of peridotite, kimberlite is quite rare.
- Pyroxene peridotite: From 40% to 90% olivine and less than 5% hornblende
  - Harzburgite: less than 5% clinopyroxene
    Harzburgite makes up the bulk of the peridotite layer of ophiolites. It is interpreted as depleted mantle rock, from which basaltic magma has been extracted. It also forms as a cumulate in Type I layered intrusions, forming a layer just above the dunite layer. Harzburgite likely makes up most of the mantle lithosphere underneath continental cratons.
  - Wehrlite: less than 5% orthopyroxene
    Wehrlite makes up part of the transition zone between the peridotite layer and overlying gabbro layer of ophiolites. In Type II layered intrusions, it takes the place of harzburgite as the layer just above the dunite layer.
  - Lherzolite: intermediate content of clinopyroxene and orthopyroxene
    Lherzolite is thought to make up much of the upper mantle. It has almost exactly the composition of a mixture of three parts harzburgite and one part tholeiitic basalt (pyrolite) and is the likely source rock for basaltic magma. It is found as rare xenoliths in basalt, such as those of Kilbourne Hole in southern New Mexico, US, and at Oahu, Hawaii, US.
- Hornblende peridotite: From 40% to 90% olivine and less than 5% pyroxene
  Hornblende peridotite is found as rare xenoliths in andesites above subduction zones. They are direct evidence of alteration of mantle rock by fluids released by the subducting slab.
- Pyroxene hornblende peridotite: Intermediate between pyroxene peridotite and hornblende peridotite

Pyroxene hornblende peridotite is found as rare xenoliths, such as those of Wilcza Góra in southwest Poland. Here it likely formed by alteration of mantle rock by carbonated hydrous silicic fluids associated with volcanism.

== Composition ==
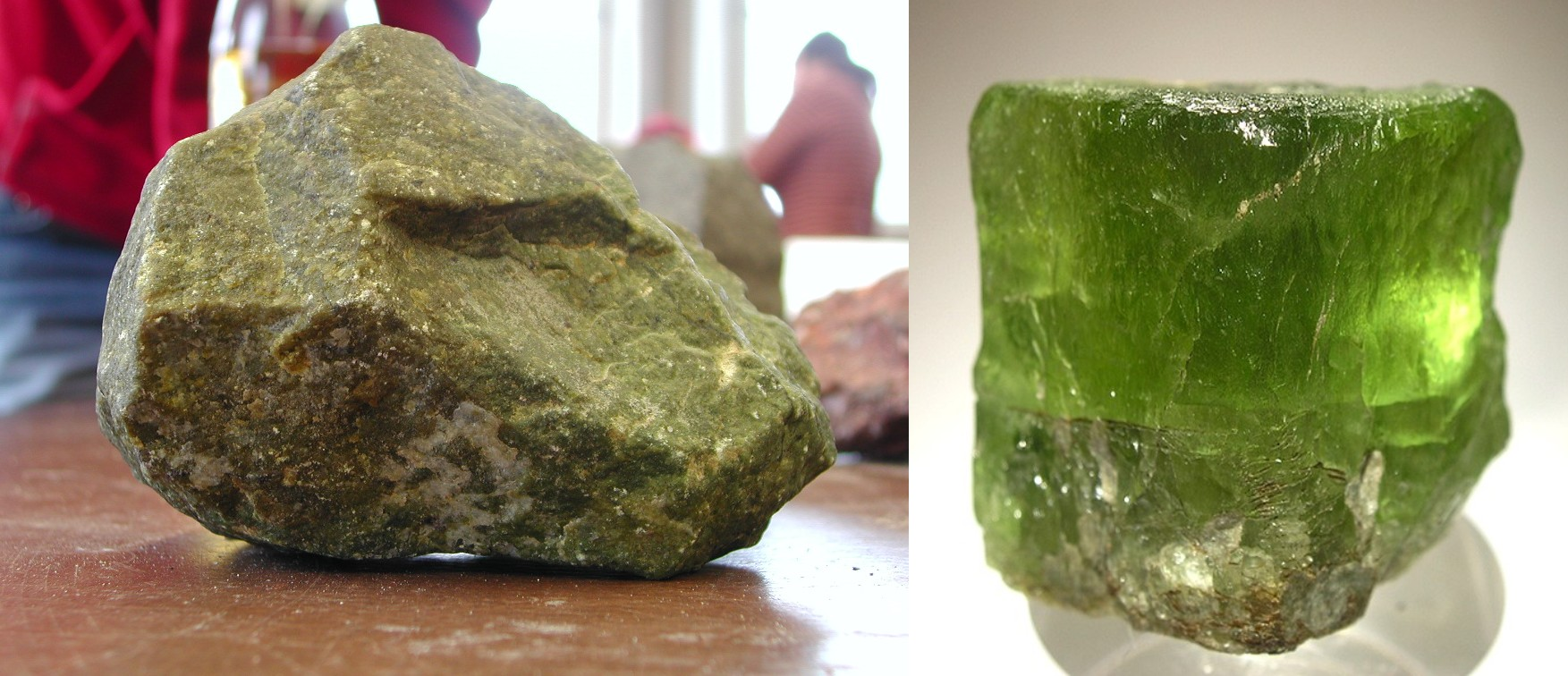
Typical peridotite sample (dunite, left) and large olivine crystal (right)

Mantle peridotite is highly enriched in magnesium, with a typical magnesium number of 89. In other words, of the total content of iron plus magnesium, 89 mol% is magnesium. This is reflected in the composition of the mafic minerals making up the peridotite.

Olivine is the essential mineral found in all peridotites. It is an iron-magnesium orthosilicate with the variable formula (Mg,Fe)_{2}SiO_{4}. The magnesium-rich olivine of peridotites is typically olive-green in color.

Pyroxenes are chain silicates having the variable formula (Ca,Na,Fe^{II},Mg)(Cr,Al,Fe^{III},Mg,Mn,Ti,V)Si_{2}O_{6} comprising a large group of different minerals. These are divided into orthopyroxenes (with an orthorhombic crystal structure) and clinopyroxenes (with a monoclinic crystal structure). This distinction is important in the classification of pyroxene peridotites since clinopyroxene melts more easily than orthopyroxene or olivine. The most common orthopyroxene is enstatite, Mg_{2}Si_{2}O_{6}, in which iron substitutes for some of the magnesium. The most important clinopyroxene is diopside, CaMgSi_{2}O_{6}, again with some substitution of iron for magnesium (hedenbergite, FeCaSi_{2}O_{6}). Ultramafic rock in which the fraction of pyroxenes exceeds 60% are classified as pyroxenites rather than peridotites. Pyroxenes are typically dark in color.

Hornblende is an amphibole, a group of minerals resembling pyroxenes but with a double chain structure incorporating water. Hornblende itself has a highly variable composition, ranging from tschermakite (Ca_{2}(Mg,Fe)_{3}Al_{2}Si_{6}Al_{2}O_{22}(OH)_{2}) to pargasite (NaCa_{2}(Mg,Fe)_{4}AlSi_{6}Al_{2}O_{22}(OH)_{2}) with many other variations in composition. It is present in peridotite mostly as a consequence of alteration by hydrous fluids.

Although peridotites are classified by their content of olivine, pyroxenes, and hornblende, a number of other mineral families are characteristically present in peridotites and may make up a significant fraction of their composition. For example, chromite is sometimes present in amounts of up to 50%. (A chromite composition above 50% reclassifies the rock as a peridotitic chromitite.) Other common accessory minerals include spinel, garnet, biotite, or magnetite. A peridotite containing significant amounts of one of these minerals may have its classification refined accordingly; for example, if a lhertzolite contains up to 5% spinel, it is a spinel-bearing lhertzolite, while for amounts up to 50%, it would be classified as a spinel lhertzolite. The accessory minerals can be useful for estimating the depth of formation of the peridotite. For example, the aluminium in lhertzolite is present as plagioclase at depths shallower than about 20 kilometers (12 mi), while it is present as spinel between 20 km and 60 kilometers (37 mi) and as garnet below 60 km.

== Distribution and location ==
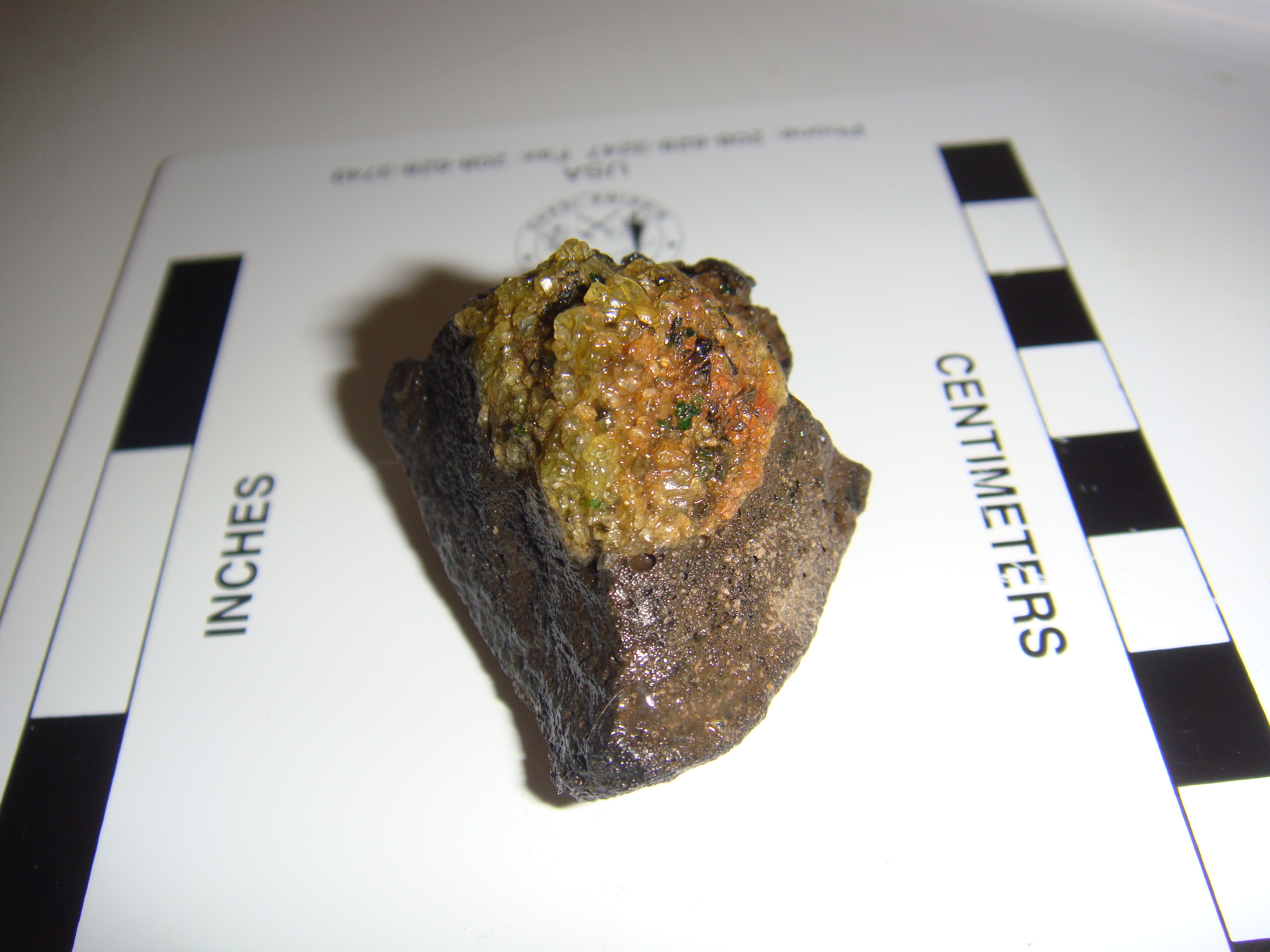
Olivine in a peridotite weathering to iddingsite within a mantle xenolith

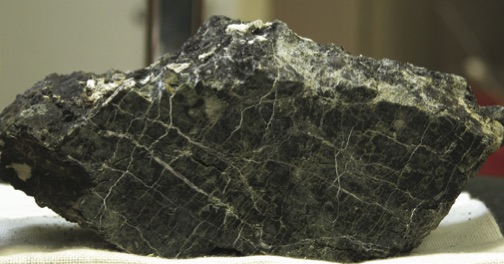
Serpentinized and carbonated peridotite

Peridotite is the dominant rock of the Earth's mantle above a depth of about 400 km; below that depth, olivine is converted to the higher-pressure mineral wadsleyite.

Oceanic plates consist of up to about 100 km of peridotite covered by a thin crust. The crust, commonly about 6 km thick, consists of basalt, gabbro, and minor sediments. The peridotite below the ocean crust, "abyssal peridotite", is found on the walls of rifts in the deep sea floor. Oceanic plates are usually subducted back into the mantle in subduction zones. However, pieces can be emplaced into or overthrust on continental crust by a process called obduction, rather than carried down into the mantle. The emplacement may occur during orogenies, as during collisions of one continent with another or with an island arc. The pieces of oceanic plates emplaced within continental crust are referred to as ophiolites. Typical ophiolites consist mostly of peridotite plus associated rocks such as gabbro, pillow basalt, diabase sill-and-dike complexes, and red chert. Alpine peridotite or orogenic peridotite massif is an older term for an ophiolite emplaced in a mountain belt during a continent-continent plate collision.

Peridotites also occur as fragments (xenoliths) carried up by magmas from the mantle. Among the rocks that commonly include peridotite xenoliths are basalt and kimberlite. Although kimberlite is a variant of peridotite, kimberlite is also considered as brecciated volcanic material as well, which is why it is referred to as a source of peridotite xenoliths. Peridotite xenoliths contain osmium and other elements whose stable isotope ratios provide clues on the formation and evolution of the Earth's mantle. Such xenoliths originate from depths of up to nearly 200 kilometers (120 mi) or more.

The volcanic equivalent of peridotites are komatiites, which were mostly erupted early in the Earth's history and are rare in rocks younger than Archean in age.

Small pieces of peridotite have been found in lunar breccias.

The rocks of the peridotite family are uncommon at the surface and are highly unstable, because olivine reacts quickly with water at typical temperatures of the upper crust and at the Earth's surface. Many, if not most, surface outcrops have been at least partly altered to serpentinite, a process in which the pyroxenes and olivines are converted to green serpentine. This hydration reaction involves considerable increase in volume with concurrent deformation of the original textures. Serpentinites are mechanically weak and so flow readily within the earth. Distinctive plant communities grow in soils developed on serpentinite, because of the unusual composition of the underlying rock. One mineral in the serpentine group, chrysotile, is a type of asbestos.

== Color, morphology, and texture ==
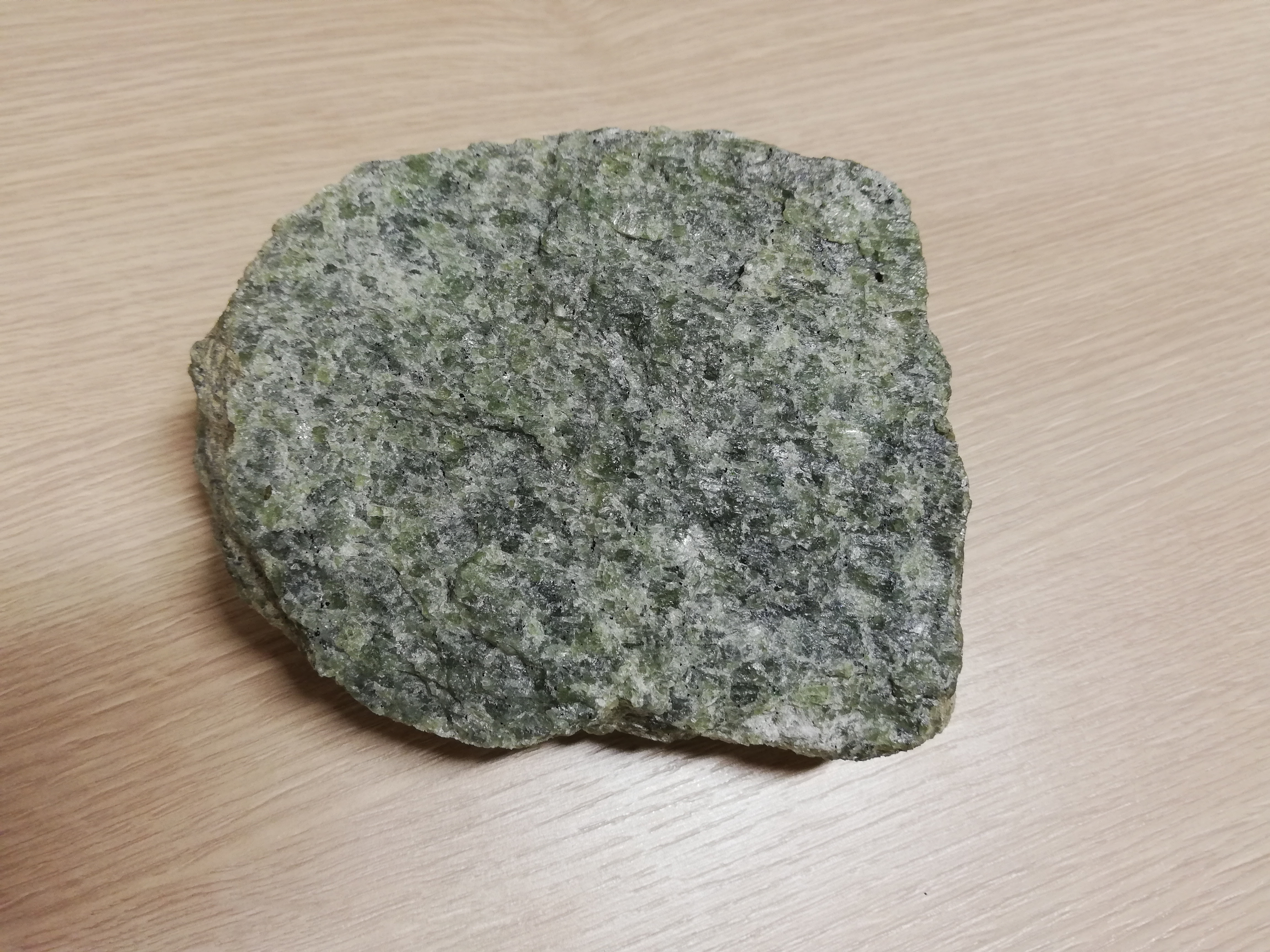
Alpine peridotite from the Ivrea zone in the Alps of Italy (dunite from Finero)

Most peridotite is green in color due to its high olivine content. However, peridotites can range in color from greenish-gray to nearly black to pale yellowish-green. Peridotite weathers to form a distinctive brown crust in subaerial exposures and to a deep orange color in submarine exposures.

Peridotites can take on a massive form or may be in layers on a variety of size scales. Layered peridotites may form the base layers of layered intrusions. These are characterized by cumulate textures, characterized by a fabric of coarse (>5mm) interlocking euhedral (well-formed) crystals in a groundmass of finer crystals formed from liquid magma trapped in the cumulate. Many show poikilitic texture in which crystallization of this liquid has produced crystals that overgrow and enclose the original cumulus crystals (called chadrocrysts).

Another texture is a well-annealed texture of equal sized anhedral crystals with straight grain boundaries intersecting at 120°. This may result when slow cooling allowed recrystallization to minimize surface energy. Cataclastic texture, showing irregular fractures and deformation twinning of olivine grains, is common in peridotites because of the deformation associated with their tectonic mode of emplacement.

== Origin ==
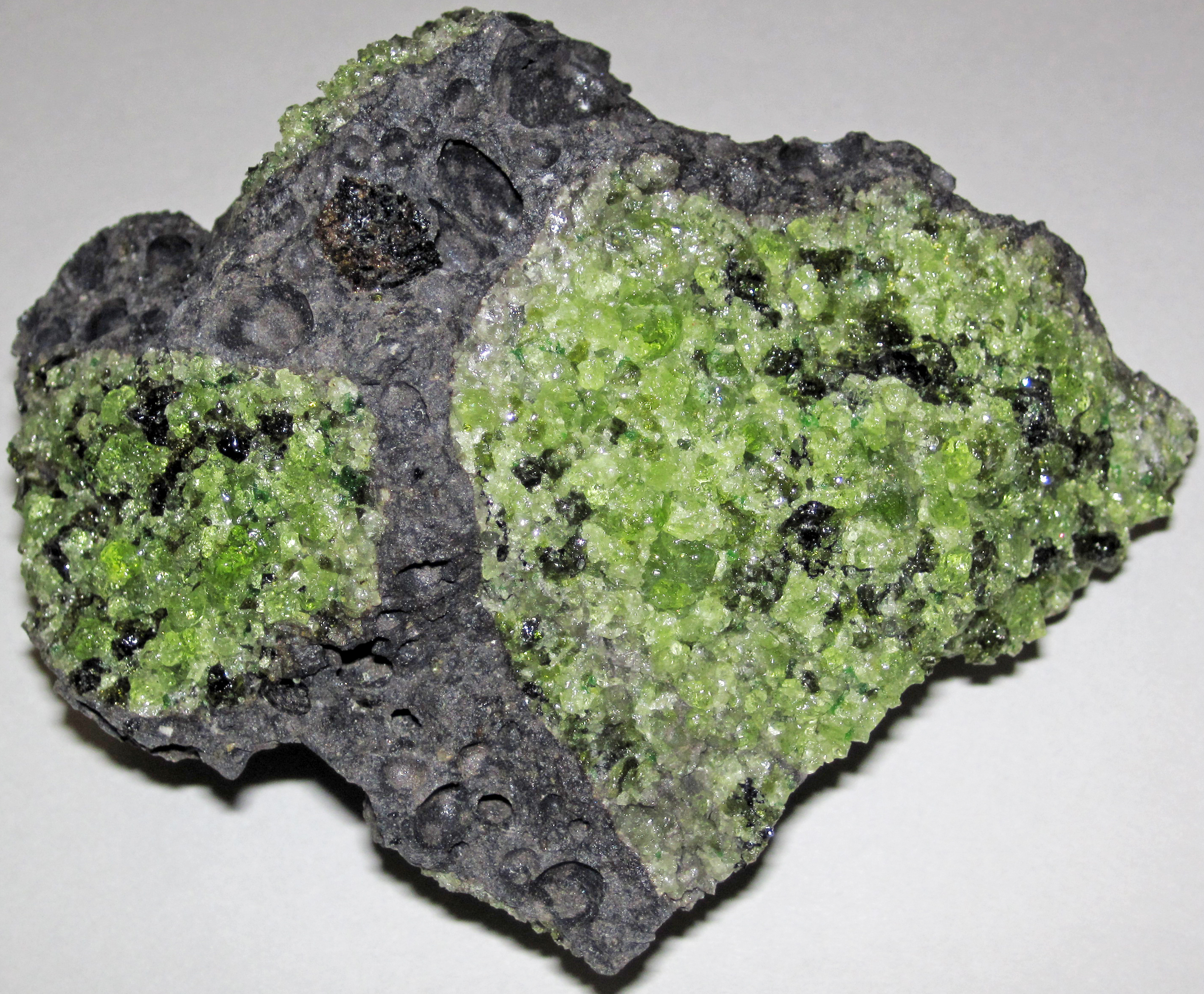
Peridotite xenoliths in phonotephrite, from Arizona

Peridotites have two primary modes of origin: as mantle rocks formed during the accretion and differentiation of the Earth, or as cumulate rocks formed by precipitation of olivine ± pyroxenes from basaltic or ultramafic magmas. These magmas are ultimately derived from the upper mantle by partial melting of mantle peridotites.

Mantle peridotites are sampled as ophiolites in collisional mountain ranges, as xenoliths in basalt or kimberlite, or as abyssal peridotites (sampled from ocean floor). These rocks represent either fertile mantle (lherzolite) or partially depleted mantle (harzburgite, dunite). Alpine peridotites may be either of the ophiolite association and representing the uppermost mantle below ocean basins, or masses of subcontinental mantle emplaced along thrust faults in mountain belts.

Layered peridotites are igneous sediments and form by mechanical accumulation of dense olivine crystals. They form from mantle-derived magmas, such as those of basalt composition. Peridotites associated with Alaskan-type ultramafic complexes are cumulates that probably formed in the root zones of volcanoes. Cumulate peridotites are also formed in komatiite lava flows.

== Peridotite in space ==
=== Missing mantle problem ===
The "missing mantle problem" represents a major paradox in planetary science regarding the extreme scarcity of peridotitic meteorites in terrestrial collections. Standard planetary differentiation models dictate that the collision and disruption of early differentiated planetesimals should yield extensive mantle debris composed of dunitic or harzburgitic peridotite, alongside iron cores and basaltic crusts. While iron meteorites (from planetary cores) and basaltic achondrites (from crusts) are well-represented, true peridotitic meteorites representing intact planetary mantles are exceedingly rare.

There are two main hypotheses explain the overall deficit of bulk peridotitic bodies in space:

- The "battered to bits" scenario: Proponents argue that prolonged cosmic ray exposure and subsequent space weathering over billions of years preferentially pulverized friable olivine-rich mantles into dust below telescopic detection limits.
- Dynamic core stripping: Alternative models suggest that "hit-and-run" planetary collisions during the early Solar System may have stripped away metal cores without dispersing massive quantities of intact mantle rocks into the asteroid belt.

Spectroscopic observations confirm this structural deficit, showing that peridotite-like (A-type) asteroids make up less than 0.1% of the observed main asteroid belt population.

=== Asteroidal peridotitic meteorites ===
The few recovered meteorites with peridotitic mineral compositions generally do not represent simple, pristine mantle layers from fully differentiated bodies with exceptions form Mars:

- Brachinites: These are wherlitic primitive anachondrites that are rich in olivine and augite, but they represent primitive, incomplete melts rather than fully differentiated mantles.
- Ureilites: Some dunitic and harzburgitic ureilites have peridotite-like mineralogy, but they retain anomalous carbonaceous and oxygen isotopic signatures, pointing to a complex residual origin rather than a standard magma ocean mantle.
- Pallasites: These stony-iron meteorites contain highly magnesium rich peridotitic olivine, but they are physically embedded within a metallic nickel-iron matrix, representing the core-mantle boundary zone rather than bulk upper mantle material. Main group pallasites have been correlated to IIIAB iron meteorites, Eagle station pallasites to IIF irons, and pyroxene pallasites to IAB irons.

=== NWA 12217 ===
Northwest Africa 12217 is a A dunitic achondrite consisting of approximately 93% olivine that exists as a monomict fragmental impact breccia. Isotopic data shows a possible link to the mantle of the differentiated asteroid 4 Vesta, providing a crucial piece of evidence for the solar system's "missing mantle problem".

=== Lherzolitic shergottites ===
Lherzolitic shergottites are a rare subclass of Martian meteorites within the shergottite group. They are medium grained, plutonic ultramafic rocks that originated as magmatic cumulates deep within the Martian subsurface, closely resembling terrestrial lherzolites.

Characterized by a distinct poikilitic to non poikilitic texture, their interior composition typically consists of roughly 50% to 55% olivine, 35% pyroxene (both pigeonite and augite), and 5% to 8% maskelynite, an amorphous version of plagioclase feldspar created by severe shock metamorphism during ejection from Mars. Prominent examples discovered on Earth include the Antarctic find ALHA77005 and the Moroccan find NWA 1950.

=== Chassignites (Martian dunite) ===
Chassignites are an ultra rare class of Martian meteorites that serve as prime examples of Martian peridotites. They are petrologically classified as cumulate dunites, primarily consisting of approximately 85% to 96% iron and magnesium rich olivine. The remaining crystal matrix is composed of minor pyroxene (augite and pigeonite), plagioclase, and chromite.

Just like the related lherzolitic shergottites, chassignites feature distinctive, coarse grained cumulative plutonic textures indicating they crystalized slowly within a magmatic chamber or shallow sub surface environment on Mars roughly 1.34 to 1.38 billion years ago. Only three verified chassignite specimens have ever been recovered on Earth: the historic Chassigny meteorite (which fell in France in 1815), NWA 2737 (informally named "Diderot"), and NWA 8694. Geochemical tracking suggests these olivine-rich rocks originated from a highly differentiated planetary mantle or deep crustal source.

== Associated rocks ==
Komatiites are high temperature partial melts of peridotite characterized by a high degree of partial melting deep below the surface.

Eclogite is a metamorphic rock composed primarily of omphacite (sodic clinopyroxene) and pyrope-rich garnet. Eclogite is associated with peridotite in some xenolith occurrences; it also occurs with peridotite in rocks metamorphosed at high pressures during processes related to subduction.

Pyroxenite is a similar group of pyroxene dominant phaneritic ultramafic igneous rock consisting of minerals from the pyroxene group (such as clinopyroxenes like augite and diopside and orthopyroxenes such as enstatite), with less than 40% olivine. It is closely allied to peridotite but distinguished by its relatively low olivine content. In upper mantle sequences such as ophiolites and orogenic peridotite massifs, pyroxenites frequently occur as discrete veins, layers, or dikes generated either by the crystallization of migrating magmas or through melt-peridotite reactions. While typically a plutonic or mantle-derived rock, pyroxenite layers can also form on the surface within exceptionally thick extrusive (differentiated) lava flows via in situ crystal settling or nucleation. A key terrestrial example is the Archean Theo's Flow in Ontario, Canada, a 120 meter thick differentiated lava flow containing a prominent pyroxenitic unit along with a basal peridotitic unit.

== Peridotites as extrusive cumulates in differentiated lava flows ==
While the majority of cumulate peridotites form within large, plutonic magma chambers, they can also develop in superficial, extrusive environments within exceptionally thick ultramafic or mafic lava flows. When highly fluid, low viscosity melts such as komatiites or high-magnesium basalts erupt onto the surface in massive sheets, the interior of the flow cools slowly enough to undergo in situ fractional crystallization and gravitational differentiation.

A primary terrestrial example of this mechanism is the Archean Theo's Flow in the Abitibi greenstone belt of Ontario, Canada. In this 120-meter-thick differentiated volcanic sequence, rapid cooling at the surface created a glass-rich chert-like flow-top breccia, while dense, early-crystallizing olivine crystals rapidly settled toward the bottom of the active flow. This mechanical gravity accumulation yielded a distinct basal olivine cumulate layer composed of serpentinized peridotite (dunite) of up to 9 meters thick, which is directly overlain by thicker pyroxenite and gabbro layers. Similar surface level differentiated peridotite layers occur in other thick, ancient ultramafic structures, such as the nearby Boston Creek komatiite flow.

== Economic geology ==
Peridotite may potentially be used in a low-cost, safe and permanent method of capturing and storing atmospheric CO_{2} as part of climate change-related greenhouse gas sequestration. It was already known that peridotite reacts with CO_{2} to form a solid carbonate-like limestone or marble mineral; and this process can be sped up a million times or more by simple drilling and hydraulic fracturing to allow injection of the CO_{2} into the subsurface peridotite formation.

Peridotite is named for the gemstone peridot, a glassy green gem originally mined on St. John's Island in the Red Sea and now mined on the San Carlos Apache Indian Reservation in Arizona.

Peridotite that has been hydrated at low temperatures is the protolith for serpentinite, which may include chrysotile asbestos (a form of serpentine) and talc.

Layered intrusions with cumulate peridotite are typically associated with sulfide or chromite ores. Sulfides associated with peridotites form nickel ores and platinoid metals; most of the platinum used in the world today is mined from the Bushveld Igneous Complex in South Africa and the Great Dyke of Zimbabwe. The chromite bands found in peridotites are the world's major source of chromium.

Ultramafic rocks such as peridotite are the basis of lateritic nickel ore deposits. Laterites form by intense mechanical and chemical weathering of a rock which breaks down the primary minerals of a rock, the ions which are created by weathering are either transported away or form new stable minerals. Elements such as nickel and cobalt forms stable oxides, clays or silicates in lateritic deposits and are therefore enriched. Ultramafic rocks are the protoliths for lateritic nickel ore deposits due to the fact that it is already enriched in nickel, containing up to 0,3% nickel. Laterites can contain up to 5% nickel. Ni-laterites occur in tropical countries where weathering forces are the strongest.
