= Magmatic underplating =

Trapping of basaltic magmas within the crust

As magma rises up to the surface, some may get trapped at the crust-mantle boundary, accumulating and eventually solidifying, thickening the crust.

Magmatic underplating occurs when basaltic magmas are trapped during their rise to the surface at the Mohorovičić discontinuity or within the crust. Entrapment (or 'stalling out') of magmas within the crust occurs due to the difference in relative densities between the rising magma and the surrounding rock. Magmatic underplating can be responsible for thickening of the crust when the magma cools. Geophysical seismic studies (as well as igneous petrology and geochemistry) utilize the differences in densities to identify underplating that occurs at depth.

== Evidence ==
Magmatic underplating has been identified using multiple techniques that are non-specific to the area in which they are used. Geochemistry allows geologists to determine levels of association between igneous units: in the Karoo Province of southern Africa, large volumes of rhyolite along the continental margin were produced from melts with initially basaltic compositions. Xenoliths of mantle material can carry information about the ultimate source of a magma, as well as reveal heterogeneities within the magma mixing and assimilation of host magmas at depth. Gabbro fractionation allows geologists to determine the smallest possible mass of concealed material. Studies of geomorphology in the Karoo Province have identified regional uplift, associated with the underplating and consequent thickening of the crust.

Seismic studies of the crust at depth have done a great deal to identify magmatic underplating, but without direct samples to look at, it can be problematic for geologists to agree on the source of an anomaly. Seismic studies of the Laccadive Islands in the Indian Ocean revealed a high-velocity layer of thickened crust between 16 and 24 km below the surface; these were corroborated with tomographic work in the nearby Kutch District, which identified a large mafic body at depth, close to the mantle. Gravity modelling also found mafic intrusive body in the lower crust in the Kachchh rift.

However, tomographic studies in Norway undertaken to identify the source of locally thickened crust found uneven thicknesses restricted by several lineaments. The morphology of the lower crust was not conclusively identified as magmatic underplating, and may in fact be the remnants of the Caledonian root.

Proximity to large igneous provinces may also be helpful in identifying magmatic underplating. Unsolidified areas of magmatic underplating (a magma chamber) may feed magma to volcanoes. In the Rajmahal Traps, there is a 10–15 km thick igneous layer at the base of the crust beneath this area. The thickness of the layer is different in various parts of the area; it is in the center, where the thickness is the greatest, where it is possible that the magma is being fed to the Rajmahal Traps up above. Presence of underplating is also found in the Cambay rift at the depth range of 25 and 31 km through gravity modeling.

== Denudation ==
In the British Isles, (Paleogene) denudation is linked with magmatic underplating. It has been shown that the wavelength and amplitude of denudation can be determined by the density and distribution of the underplating in a given area. Modeling of data brought on by studies of the British Isles shows that a large amount of high velocity material occurs around the Mohorovičić discontinuity under the Irish Sea. Epeirogenic uplift is a long-wavelength form of uplift and can be divided into two separate categories: transient and permanent. Permanent epeirogenic uplift is possibly mainly produced by magmatic underplating, while transient uplift is more associated with mantle convection. Magmatic underplating is important for causing quick epeirogenic uplift in certain areas. It has been argued that the greatest denudation happened in the Paleogene based on records of clastic deposition in sedimentary basins. Some of these sedimentary basins include the North Sea Basin, and the Porcupine Basin off the southwest coast of Ireland. It has also been argued that Paleogene denudation was mainly caused by magmatic underplating.

== Effects ==
Studies have been done on the phenomenon of magmatic underplating in various areas around the world. In northern Italy, the effects of magmatic underplating were studied along a traverse through the Strona-Ceneri Zone and the Ivrea zone. The studies included a thermal modeling method which split the cross section up into three different sections: the upper crust, the lower crust, and the upper mantle. The model displayed multiple magmatic intrusions spreading over time, which resulted in the heating up of the lower crust causing metamorphism and anatexis, and even managed to moderately heat up the top of the lower crust. The results also showed that final heating began at the same time as extension in shallower crustal levels, while in deeper parts, extension occurred later than the thermal peak of metamorphism. It was also shown that magmatic underplating during a time period of about thirty million years was strong enough to erase all tectono–metamorphic history in the Ivrea zone. This information was preserved in the Strona-Ceneri Zone because areas in the upper crust were not affected nearly as much.

Other research has been conducted in the Kutch District of Northwest India. It was concluded that the uplift that occurred in the area was due to intrusions of magma in the lower part of the crust. This uplift occurred because of two separate processes. One of these processes is due to magmatic underplating, while the other involves only isostasy. Research has shown that, during the Oxfordian Age, a peak transgressive event occurred which was followed by the deposition of shale and sandstone. It is possible that the lower units may represent a lowering of sea level; the sea began to withdraw because of the uplift related to the magmatic underplating.

== Underplating ==
Underplating, also known as tectonic underplating, is the accumulation of partial melts at the base of the crust where an ocean plate is subducting under continental crust. Underplating is the result of partial melts being produced in the mantle wedge above a subducting plate. The partial melting is induced by a lowering of the melting temperature, the solidus, by the input of water and other volatiles supplied by phase transitions in the subducting slab. When the buoyant partial melt rises upwards through the mantle, it will usually stall at the base of the crust and pond there. This is because the crust is usually less dense than the underplating magma, and this is the point at which the ascending magma reaches a level of neutral buoyancy.

The evolving melt will remain there until it fractionates enough (through melting-assimilation-storage-homogenization (MASH) processes) that the remaining melt is less dense than the surrounding rock; the melt will then continue up into the crust, leaving behind the heavier mafic minerals which were crystallized during fractional crystallization. The assemblage of minerals remaining behind are typically mafic or ultramafic, and are responsible for the observed seismic anomaly which indicates underplated material.

== See also ==
- Flood basalt – Very large volume eruption of basalt lava
- Igneous differentiation, also known as magmatic differentiation – Geologic process in formation of some igneous rocks
