= Wehrlite =

Ultramafic rock

- Igneous rock
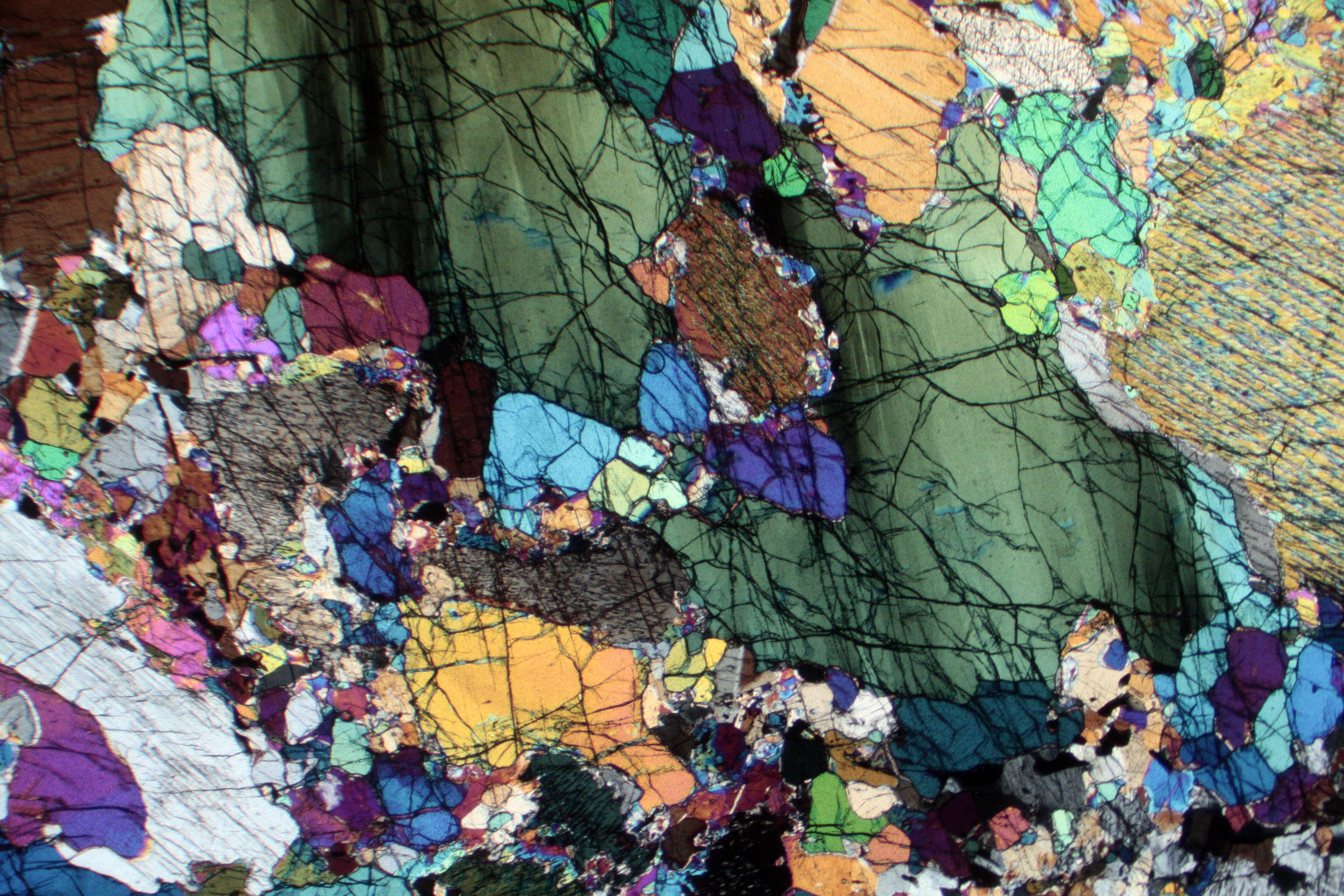
- Photomicrograph of a thin section of wehrlite, in cross-polarised light.

Composition
- Classification: Ultramafic
- Primary: olivine and clinopyroxene
- Secondary: orthopyroxene, hornblende, spinel, garnet, anorthite, bytownite
- Texture: Phaneritic

Wehrlite is an ultramafic and ultrabasic rock that is a mixture of olivine and clinopyroxene. It is a subdivision of the peridotites.

Wehrlite is a mixture of olivine and clinopyroxene.

The nomenclature allows up to a few percent of orthopyroxene. Accessory minerals include ilmenite, chromite, magnetite and an aluminium-bearing mineral (plagioclase, spinel or garnet).

Wehrlites occur as mantle xenoliths and in ophiolites. Another occurrence is as cumulate in gabbro and norite layered intrusions. Some meteorites can also be classified as wehrlites (e.g. NWA 4797).

Wehrlite is named after Alois Wehrle. He was born 1791 in Kroměříž, Czech Republic (then Kremsier in Mähren) and was a professor at the "Ungarische Bergakademie" (Hungarian Mining School) in Banská Štiavnica, Slovakia (then Schemnitz, Kingdom of Hungary).

== Brachinites ==
Brachinites are a class of wherlitic primitive anachondrites that consist almost entirely of olivine, which ranges from 74 to 98% by volume. These often have accessory minerals such as plagioclase (6.7 to 12.9%), iron Sulfides (1.8 to 4.0%), clinopyroxene (1.5 to 8.2%) and orthopyroxene (0 to 2.4%) with traces of phosphates and meteoritic iron. The only deviation from regular chondrites is their high olivine to orthopyroxene ratio.
