= Basement (geology) =

Metamorphic or igneous rocks below a sedimentary platform or cover

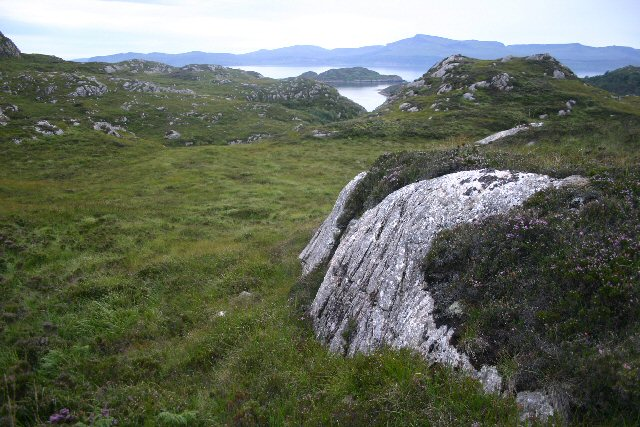
Gneiss outcrop, basement rock, Scotland

In geology, basement and crystalline basement are crystalline rocks lying above the mantle and beneath all other rocks and sediments. They are sometimes exposed at the surface, but often they are buried under miles of rock and sediment. The basement rocks lie below a sedimentary platform or cover, or more generally any rock below sedimentary rocks or sedimentary basins that are metamorphic or igneous in origin. In the same way, the sediments or sedimentary rocks on top of the basement can be called a "cover" or "sedimentary cover".

Basement rock consists of continental crustal rock which has been modified several times through tectonic events including deformation, metamorphism, deposition, partial melting and magmatism.

== Continental crust ==
Basement rock is the thick foundation of ancient, and oldest, metamorphic and igneous rock that forms the crust of continents, often in the form of granite. Basement rock is contrasted to overlying sedimentary rocks which are laid down on top of the basement rocks after the continent was formed, such as sandstone and limestone. The sedimentary rocks which may be deposited on top of the basement usually form a relatively thin veneer, but can be more than 5 kilometres (3 mi) thick. The basement rock of the crust can be 32–48 kilometres (20–30 mi) thick or more. The basement rock can be located under layers of sedimentary rock, or be visible at the surface.

Basement rock is visible, for example, at the bottom of the Grand Canyon, consisting of 1.7- to 2-billion-year-old granite (Zoroaster Granite) and schist (Vishnu Schist). The Vishnu Schist is believed to be highly metamorphosed igneous rocks and shale, from basalt, mud and clay laid from volcanic eruptions, and the granite is the result of magma intrusions into the Vishnu Schist. An extensive cross section of sedimentary rocks laid down on top of it through the ages is visible as well.

== Age ==
The basement rocks of the continental crust tend to be much older than the oceanic crust. The oceanic crust can be from 0–340 million years in age, with an average age of 64 million years. Continental crust is older because continental crust is light and thick enough so it is not subducted, while oceanic crust is periodically subducted and replaced at subduction and oceanic rifting areas.

== Complexity ==
The basement rocks are often highly metamorphosed and complex, and are usually crystalline. They may consist of many different types of rock – volcanic, intrusive igneous and metamorphic. They may also contain ophiolites, which are fragments of oceanic crust that became wedged between plates when a terrane was accreted to the edge of the continent. Any of this material may be folded, refolded and metamorphosed. New igneous rock may freshly intrude into the crust from underneath, or may form underplating, where the new igneous rock forms a layer on the underside of the crust. The majority of continental crust on the planet is around 1 to 3 billion years old, and it is theorised that there was at least one period of rapid expansion and accretion to the continents during the Precambrian.

== The U.S East Coast ==
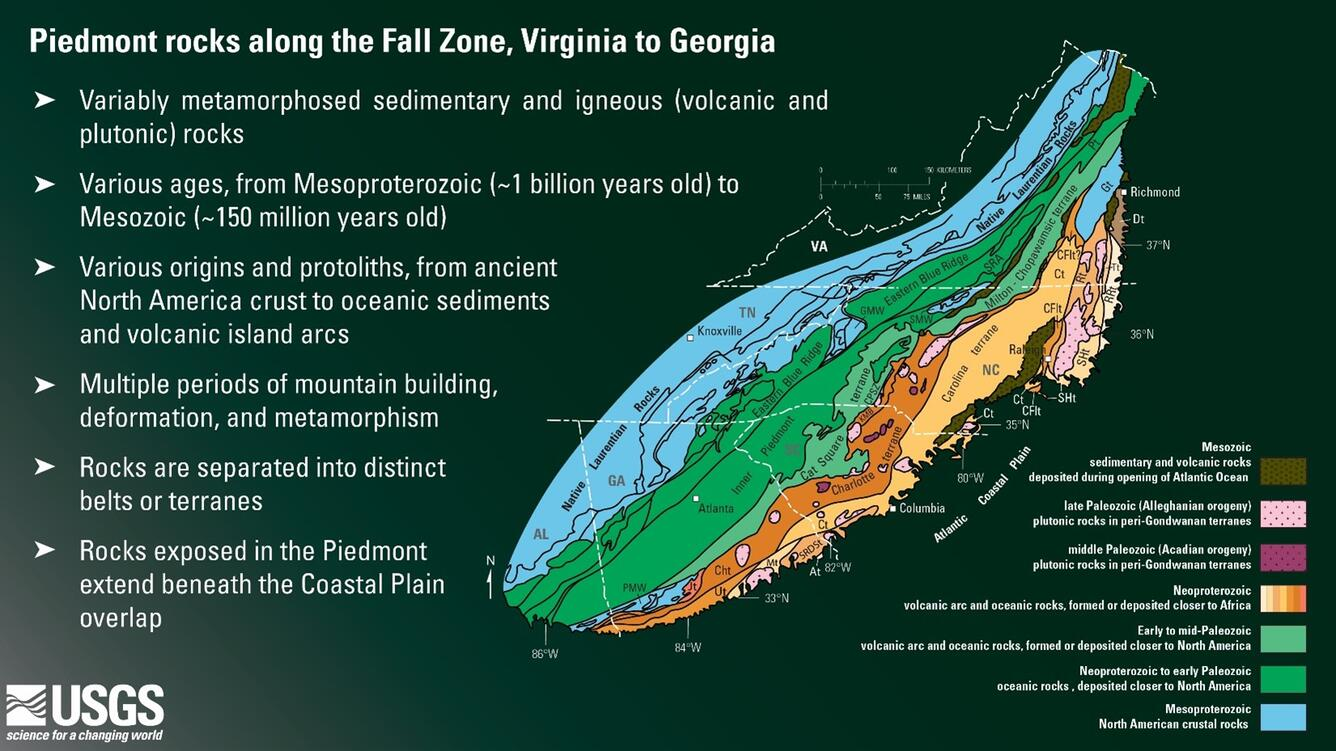
A USGS map of US east coast Piedmont rocks, their location, and general ages.

The U.S. East Coast offers an example of basement rock geology.

The crystalline basement underlying the U.S. East Coast formed largely during late Paleozoic mountain-building as Africa (Gondwana) collided with North America (Laurentia) to assemble Pangaea. This culminated in the Alleghanian orogeny (ca. 325–260 Ma), which welded metamorphic and igneous terranes into the Appalachian core. This created the deep, resistant foundation of the North American craton now buried beneath much of the Coastal Plain from Florida to New York.

In the south, geochronology indicates that parts of Florida's basement rocks are Gondwanan (African) in origin and were welded to North America during Pangaea's assembly. Detrital and igneous zircon U–Pb ages from basement samples under the sedimentary layer shows Neoproterozoic–Paleozoic aged rocks consistent with an African provenance. This supports Florida being an exotic terrane sutured to Laurentia before the Mesozoic.

During Late Triassic–Early Jurassic, rifting associated with the break up of Pangea produced numerous elongate rift basins formed along the present East Coast (the Newark Supergroup). This records continental extension that preceded opening of the Atlantic Ocean. These syn-rift basins have thick fluvial–lake sediments and early Jurassic basalt flows and mark the transition from divergent to passive margin tectonics along the Appalachian Mountains.

After seafloor spreading began in the Early Jurassic, the margin (the future east coast of the U.S) evolved into a passive margin. From the Late Jurassic through the Cretaceous and Cenozoic, a seaward-thickening sedimentary wedge of sands, silts, clays, and carbonates accumulated above the buried basement. These are largely from erosion of the Appalachian Mountains and deposited across the Coastal Plain and continental shelf. In the Mid-Atlantic region, the emergent Coastal Plain sediments thin inland from the Atlantic coast. Sediments above the basement can reach a depths of 10,000 ft (~3 km) near Cape Hatteras, North Carolina. A much thicker sediment layer can be found offshore in the Baltimore Canyon Trough.

The boundary between the sediment coastal plain and the crystalline rocks is known as the Fall Line. This is where rivers drop from the hard, metamorphic Piedmont basement onto the softer, younger Coastal Plain sediments. Geologically, the Fall Line is the approximate edge of crystalline basement rocks exposed at the surface. Further southeastward, the same crystalline basement continues beneath the Coastal Plain and continental shelf, as shown by drill cores and geophysical surveys. Multiple boreholes and geophysical samples along the Coastal Plain from Georgia to Massachusetts directly document a pre-Cretaceous basement beneath the sedimentary cover. This confirms that Appalachian crystalline units persist beneath the coastal plain and continue offshore into the Atlantic.

Studies from rock layers in the northern Baltimore Canyon Trough and the nearby Coastal Plain show that during the Cretaceous, changes in sea level and the slow sinking of the Atlantic margin controlled how sediments were deposited. This also matches the rock layers on land and their counterparts offshore across the hinge zone (the offshore bend where the crust dips and sediment layers thicken seaward).

== Volcanism ==
When a plate of oceanic crust is subducted beneath an overriding plate of oceanic crust, as the underthrusting crust melts, it causes an upwelling of magma that can cause volcanism along the subduction front on the overriding plate. This produces an oceanic volcanic arc, like Japan. This volcanism causes metamorphism, introduces igneous intrusions, and thickens the crust by depositing additional layers of extrusive igneous rock from volcanoes. This tends to make the crust thicker and less dense, making it immune to subduction.

Oceanic crust can be subducted, while continental crust cannot. Eventually, the subduction of the underthrusting oceanic crust can bring the volcanic arc close to a continent, with which it may collide. When this happens, instead of being subducted, it is accreted to the edge of the continent and becomes part of it. Thin strips or fragments of the underthrusting oceanic plate may also remain attached to the edge of the continent so that they are wedged and tilted between the converging plates, creating ophiolites. In this manner, continents can grow over time as new terranes are accreted to their edges, and so continents can be composed of a complex quilt of terranes of varying ages.

As such, the basement rock can become younger going closer to the edge of the continent. There are exceptions, however, such as exotic terranes. Exotic terranes are pieces of other continents that have broken off from their original parent continent and have become accreted to a different continent.

== Cratons ==
Continents can consist of several continental cratons – blocks of crust built around an initial original core of continents – that gradually grew and expanded as additional newly created terranes were added to their edges. For instance, Pangea consisted of most of the Earth's continents being accreted into one giant supercontinent. Most continents, such as Asia, Africa and Europe, include several continental cratons, as they were formed by the accretion of many smaller continents.

== Usage ==
In Geology of the European Alps, the basement generally refers to rocks older than the Variscan orogeny. On top of this older basement Permian evaporites and Mesozoic limestones were deposited. The evaporites formed a weak zone on which the harder (stronger) limestone cover was able to move over the hard basement, making the distinction between basement and cover even more pronounced.

In Andean geology the basement refers to the Proterozoic, Paleozoic and early Mesozoic (Triassic to Jurassic) rock units as the basement to the late Mesozoic and Cenozoic Andean sequences developed following the onset of subduction along the western margin of the South American Plate.

When discussing the Trans-Mexican Volcanic Belt of Mexico the basement include Proterozoic, Paleozoic and Mesozoic age rocks for the Oaxaquia, the Mixteco and the Guerrero terranes respectively.

The term basement is used mostly in disciplines of geology like basin geology, sedimentology and petroleum geology in which the (typically Precambrian) crystalline basement is not of interest as it rarely contains petroleum or natural gas. The term economic basement is also used to describe the deeper parts of a cover sequence that are of no economic interest.

== See also ==
- Shield – Large stable area of exposed Precambrian crystalline rock
- Bedrock – Solid rock under loose surface material

== Sources ==
- Parker, Sybil P., ed. (2003). McGraw-Hill dictionary of geology and mineralogy (2nd ed.). New York: McGraw-Hill. ISBN 0-07-141044-9. OCLC 50731349..
- Bates, Robert L.; Jackson, Julia A., eds. (1984). Dictionary of geological terms. Bates, Robert Latimer, 1912-, Jackson, Julia A., 1939-, American Geological Institute. (3rd ed., Anchor books ed.). Garden City, N.Y.: Anchor Press/Doubleday. ISBN 0-385-18100-0. OCLC 9412868.
- Basement and basins of eastern North America. Van der Pluijm, Ben A., 1955-, Catacosinos, Paul A., 1933-. Boulder, Colo.: Geological Society of America. 1996. ISBN 0-8137-2308-6. OCLC 35068112.
- "Western metamorphic and sedimentary basement / New Zealand's Rocks / NZ Geology / Science Topics / Learning / Home - GNS Science". www.gns.cri.nz.
