= Dunite =

Type of peridotite with at least over 90% olivine

- Igneous rock
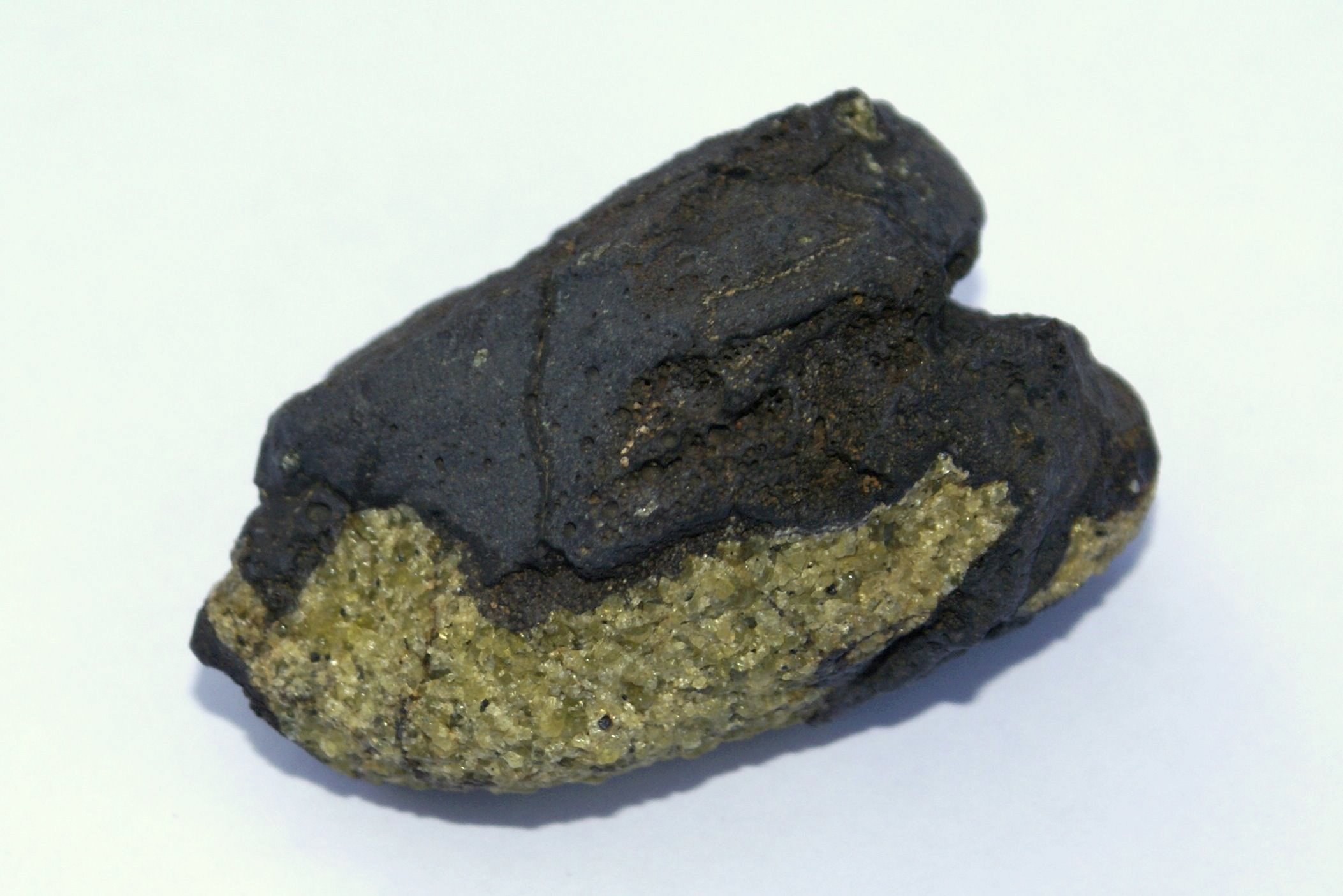
- Small volcanic bomb of (black) basanite with (green) dunite.

Composition
- Classification: Ultramafic
- Primary: olivine
- Secondary: orthopyroxene, clinopyroxene hornblende, spinel, garnet, anorthite, bytownite, chromite
- Texture: Phaneritic

Dunite (/ˈduːnaɪt, ˈdʌnaɪt/), also known as olivinite (not to be confused with the mineral olivenite), is an intrusive igneous rock of ultramafic composition and with phaneritic (coarse-grained) texture. The mineral assemblage is greater than 90% olivine, with minor amounts of other minerals such as pyroxene, hornblende, chromite, magnetite, pyrope, and plagioclase. Dunite is the olivine-rich endmember of the peridotite group of mantle-derived rocks.

Dunite and other peridotites are considered the major constituents of the Earth's mantle above a depth of about 400 km (250 mi). Dunite is rarely found within continental rocks, but where it is found, it typically occurs at the base of ophiolite sequences where slabs of mantle rock from a subduction zone have been thrust onto continental crust by obduction during continental or island arc collisions (orogeny). It is also found in alpine peridotite massifs that represent slivers of sub-continental mantle exposed during collisional orogeny. Dunite typically undergoes retrograde metamorphism in near-surface environments and is altered to serpentinite and soapstone.

The dunite field is highlighted in green.

The type of dunite found in the lowermost parts of ophiolites, alpine peridotite massifs, and xenoliths may represent the refractory residue left after the extraction of basaltic magmas in the upper mantle. However, a more likely method of dunite formation in mantle sections is by interaction between lherzolite or harzburgite and percolating silicate melts, which dissolve orthopyroxene from the surrounding rock, leaving a progressively olivine-enriched residue.

Dunite may also form by the accumulation of olivine crystals on the floor of large basaltic or picritic magma chambers. These "cumulate" dunites typically occur in thick layers in layered intrusions, associated with cumulate layers of wehrlite, olivine pyroxenite, harzburgite, and even chromitite (a cumulate rock consisting largely of chromite). Small layered intrusions may be of any geologic age, for example, the Triassic Palisades Sill in New York and the larger Eocene Skaergaard complex in Greenland. The largest layered mafic intrusions are tens of kilometers in size and almost all are Proterozoic in age, e.g. the Stillwater igneous complex (Montana), the Muskox intrusion (Canada), and the Great Dyke (Zimbabwe). Cumulate dunite may also be found in ophiolite complexes, associated with layers of lherzolite, harzburgite, pyroxenite, and gabbro.

Dunite was named by the Austrian geologist Ferdinand von Hochstetter in 1859, after Dun Mountain near Nelson, New Zealand. Dun Mountain was given its name because of the dun colour of the underlying ultramafic rocks. This color results from surface weathering that oxidizes the iron in olivine in temperate climates (weathering in tropical climates creates a deep red soil). The dunite from Dun Mountain is part of the ultramafic section of the Dun Mountain Ophiolite Belt.

A massive exposure of dunite in the United States can be found as Twin Sisters Mountain, near Mount Baker in the northern Cascade Range of Washington. In Europe it occurs in the Troodos Mountains of Cyprus. In southern British Columbia, Canada dunite rocks form the core of an ultramafic rock complex located near the small community of Tulameen. The rocks are locally enriched in platinum group metals, chromite and magnetite.

== Carbon sequestration potential ==
Dunite could be used to sequester CO_{2} and help mitigate global climate change via accelerated chemical rock weathering. This would involve the mining of dunite rocks in quarries followed by crushing and grinding to create fine ground rock that would react with the atmospheric carbon dioxide. The resulting products are magnesite and silica which could be commercialized.

$$\ce{Mg2SiO4(olivine) + 2CO2 -> 2MgCO3(magnesite) + SiO2(silica)}$$
