= Vermillion meteorite =

Meteorite found in the United States

Vermillion
- Type: Achondrite, pallasite
- Grouplet: Pyroxene pallasite grouplet
- Composition: Meteoric iron (~86%) silicates (~14%)
- Country: United States
- Region: Kansas
- Coordinates: 39°44′11″N 96°21′41″W
- Observed fall: No
- Found date: 1991
- TKW: 34.36 kilograms (75.8 lb)

The Vermillion meteorite is a pallasite (stony-iron) meteorite and one of two members of the pyroxene pallasite grouplet.

== Discovery ==
The meteorite was found near and was named after Vermillion, Marshall County, Kansas. It was found by two farmers while planting on a grain field in 1991. It was recognized as a meteorite and first described in 1995.

== Mineralogy ==
Vermillion meteorite consists of around 86 volume-% meteoric iron and 14 % silicate minerals. The silicates include olivine (93% of silicates), orthopyroxene (5%), chromite (1.5%) and merrillite (0.5%). Other accessory minerals include troilite, whitlockite, and cohenite.

== Classification ==
The Vermillion meteorite is classified as a pyroxene pallasite because it contains pyroxene as an accessory mineral and shares a distinct oxygen isotope signature with Yamato 8451. Some studies also object to this grouping, referring to the differences in siderophile trace elements and the occurrence of cohenite in the Vermillion meteorite.

== See also ==
- Glossary of meteoritics
