= Pyroxene pallasite grouplet =

Subdivision of pallasite meteorites

- — Grouplet —
- Type: Stony-iron
- Class: Pallasite
- Composition: Meteoric iron, silicate minerals (pyroxene)
- Total known specimens: 2

The pyroxene pallasite grouplet is a subdivision of the pallasite meteorites (stony-irons).

The grouplet is named "pyroxene pallasites" because they are the only pallasites that contain pyroxene. The grouplet was proposed in 1995. It currently has only two members: the Vermillion and Yamato 8451 meteorite. Both meteorites contain pyroxene and have a number of other similarities: for example their pyroxene composition, rare-earth element concentrations, and oxygen isotope ratios. However, there are also indicators against the grouping of these two meteorites: for example the texture and occurrence of cohenite in the Vermillion meteorite and the differing siderophile trace element concentrations.

== See also ==
- Glossary of meteoritics
