= Ivrea zone =

Tectonic terrane in the Italian Alps

The Ivrea zone is a tectonic terrane in the Italian Alps, that consists of a steeply dipping piece of the Earth’s lower crust of the Apulian plate. The zone is named after the Italian city of Ivrea.

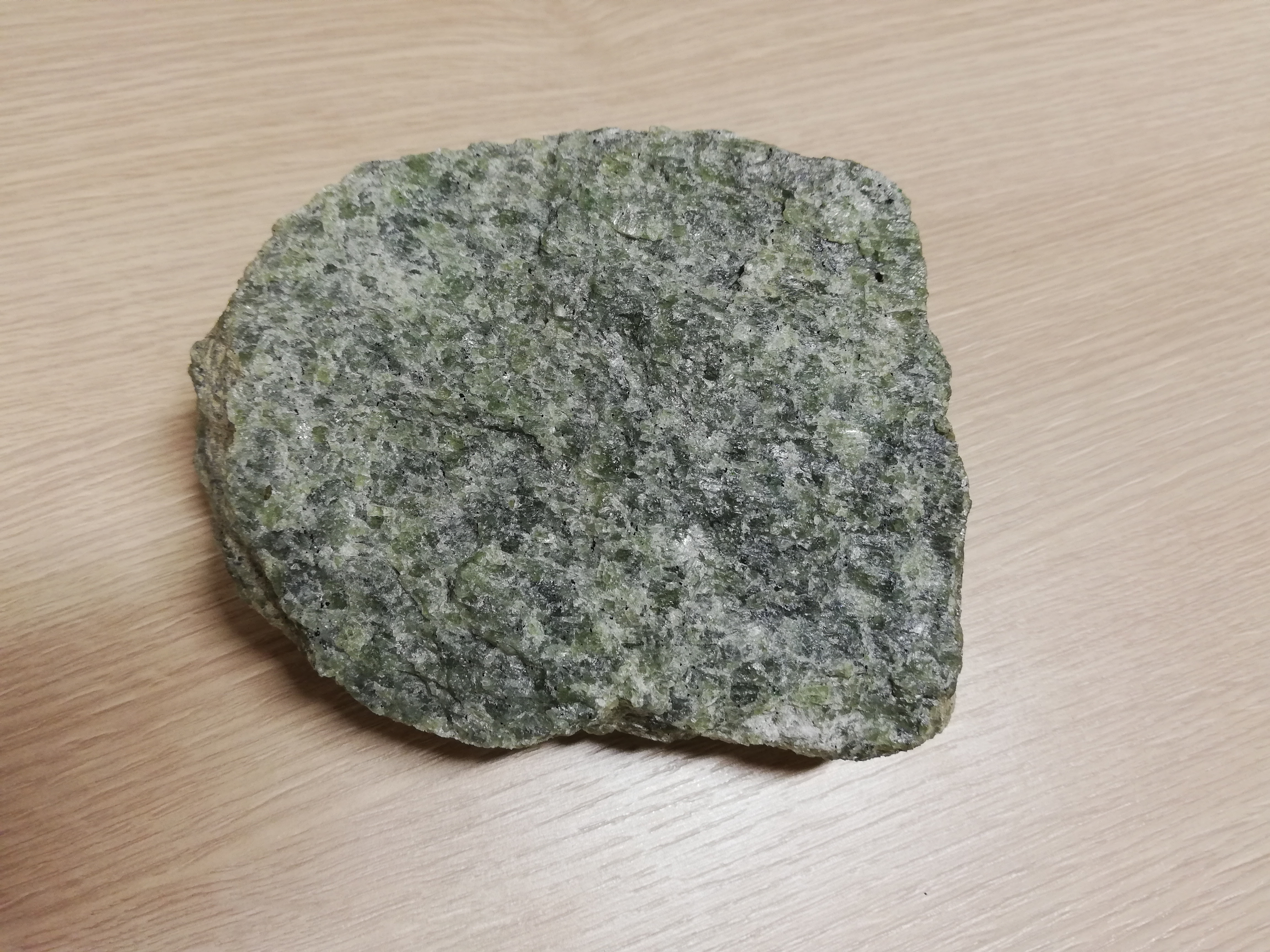
Dunite from the Ivrea zone at Finero

Geologically the Ivrea zone is considered a part of the Southern Alps. Most rocks in the zone are sedimentary, for example limestones that have been turned into marble by metamorphism. Most of the zone has been through granulite facies metamorphism and was intruded by mafic plutons. This is the type of rock common in the lower regions of the crust. When the terrane was uplifted during the formation of the Alps, the upper crust was eroded off so that these rocks are now at the surface.

Geophysical research shows the mantle is relatively close under the surface at the Ivrea zone. Some geologists think the boundary between pyroxenites and lherzolites, that is also found in outcrops in the Ivrea zone, represents the Mohorovičić discontinuity (the Moho). The Moho is seismologically defined as the boundary between the crust and mantle.

== See also ==
- Mohorovičić discontinuity – Boundary between the Earth's crust and the mantle
