= Xenolith =

Rock inside a rock with a different composition

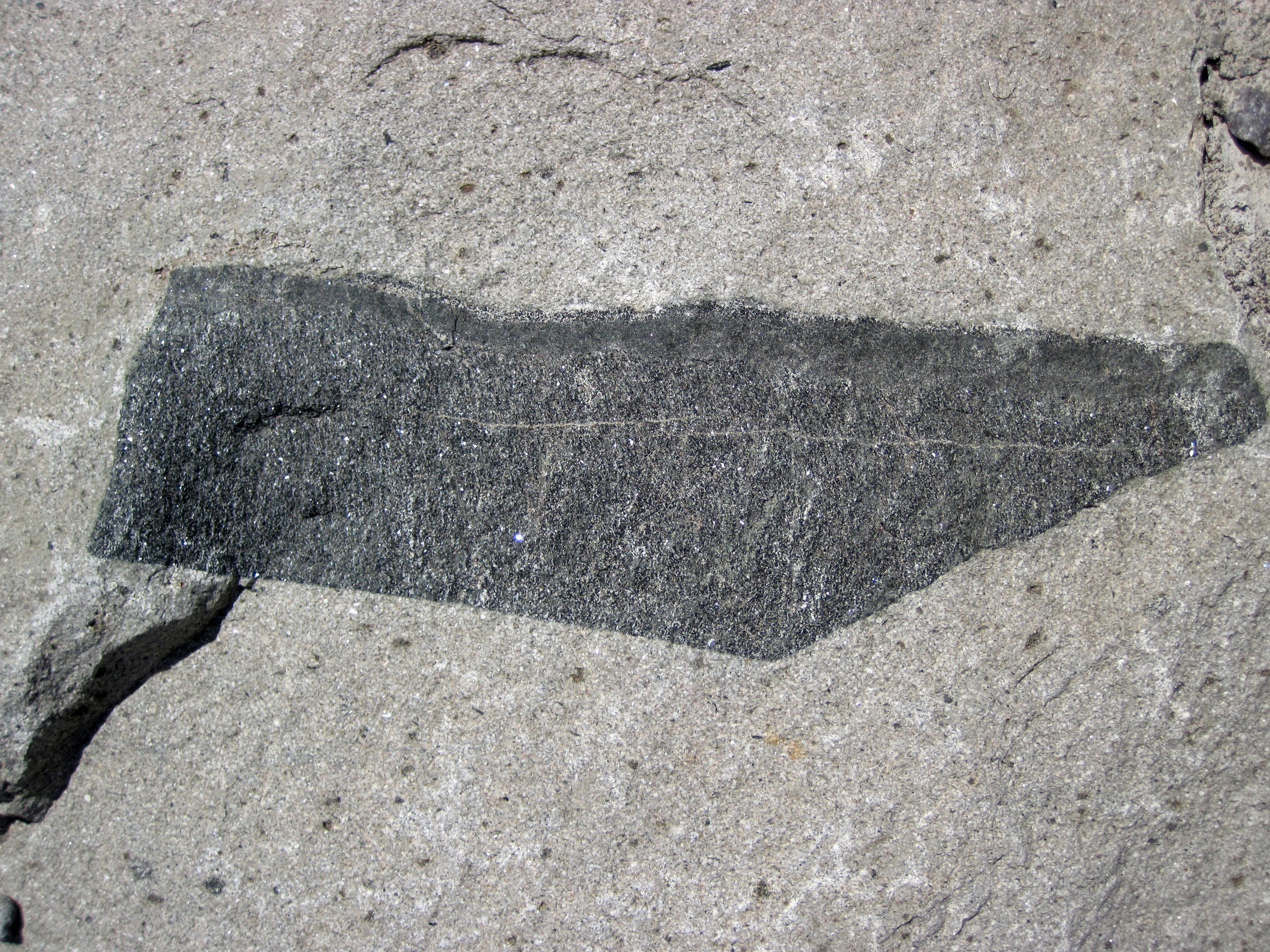
Gabbroic xenolith in andesite, Tertiary of Wyoming, United States

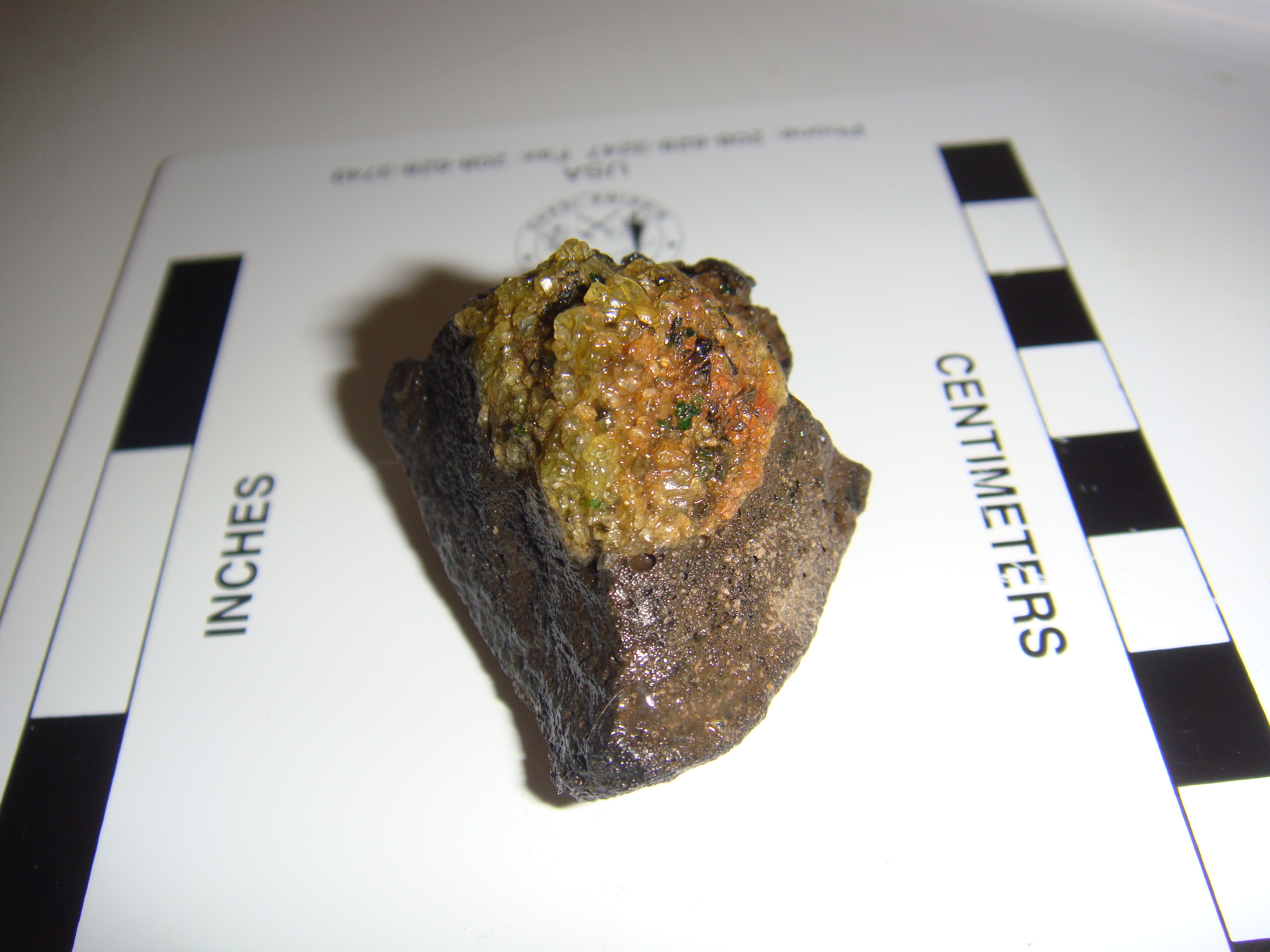
Olivine weathering to iddingsite within a mantle xenolith

A xenolith ("foreign rock") is a rock fragment (country rock) that becomes enveloped in a larger rock during the latter's development and solidification. In geology, the term xenolith is almost exclusively used to describe inclusions in igneous rock entrained during magma ascent, emplacement and eruption. Xenoliths may be engulfed along the margins of a magma chamber, torn loose from the walls of an erupting lava conduit or explosive diatreme or picked up along the base of a flowing body of lava on the Earth's surface. A xenocryst is an individual foreign crystal included within an igneous body. Examples of xenocrysts are quartz crystals in a silica-deficient lava and diamonds within kimberlite diatremes. Xenoliths can be non-uniform within individual locations, even in areas which are spatially limited, e.g. rhyolite-dominated lava of Niijima volcano (Japan) contains two types of gabbroic xenoliths which are of different origin - they were formed in different temperature and pressure conditions.

Although the term xenolith is most commonly associated with inclusions in igneous rocks, a broad definition could also include rock fragments which have become encased in sedimentary rock. Xenoliths have been found in some meteorites.

To be considered a true xenolith, the included rock must be identifiably different from the rock in which it is enveloped; an included rock of similar type is called an autolith or a cognate inclusion.

Xenoliths and xenocrysts provide important information about the composition of the otherwise inaccessible mantle. Basalts, kimberlites, lamproites and lamprophyres, which have their source in the upper mantle, often contain fragments and crystals assumed to be a part of the originating mantle mineralogy. Xenoliths of dunite, peridotite and spinel lherzolite in basaltic lava flows are one example. Kimberlites contain, in addition to diamond xenocrysts, fragments of lherzolites of varying composition. The aluminium-bearing minerals of these fragments provide clues to the depth of origin. Calcic plagioclase is stable to a depth of 25 km (16 mi). Between 25 km (16 mi) and about 60 km (37 mi), spinel is the stable aluminium phase. At depths greater than about 60 km, dense garnet becomes the aluminium-bearing mineral. Some kimberlites contain xenoliths of eclogite, which is considered to be the high-pressure metamorphic product of basaltic oceanic crust, as it descends into the mantle along subduction zones.

The large-scale inclusion of foreign rock strata at the margins of an igneous intrusion is called a roof pendant.

== Examples ==
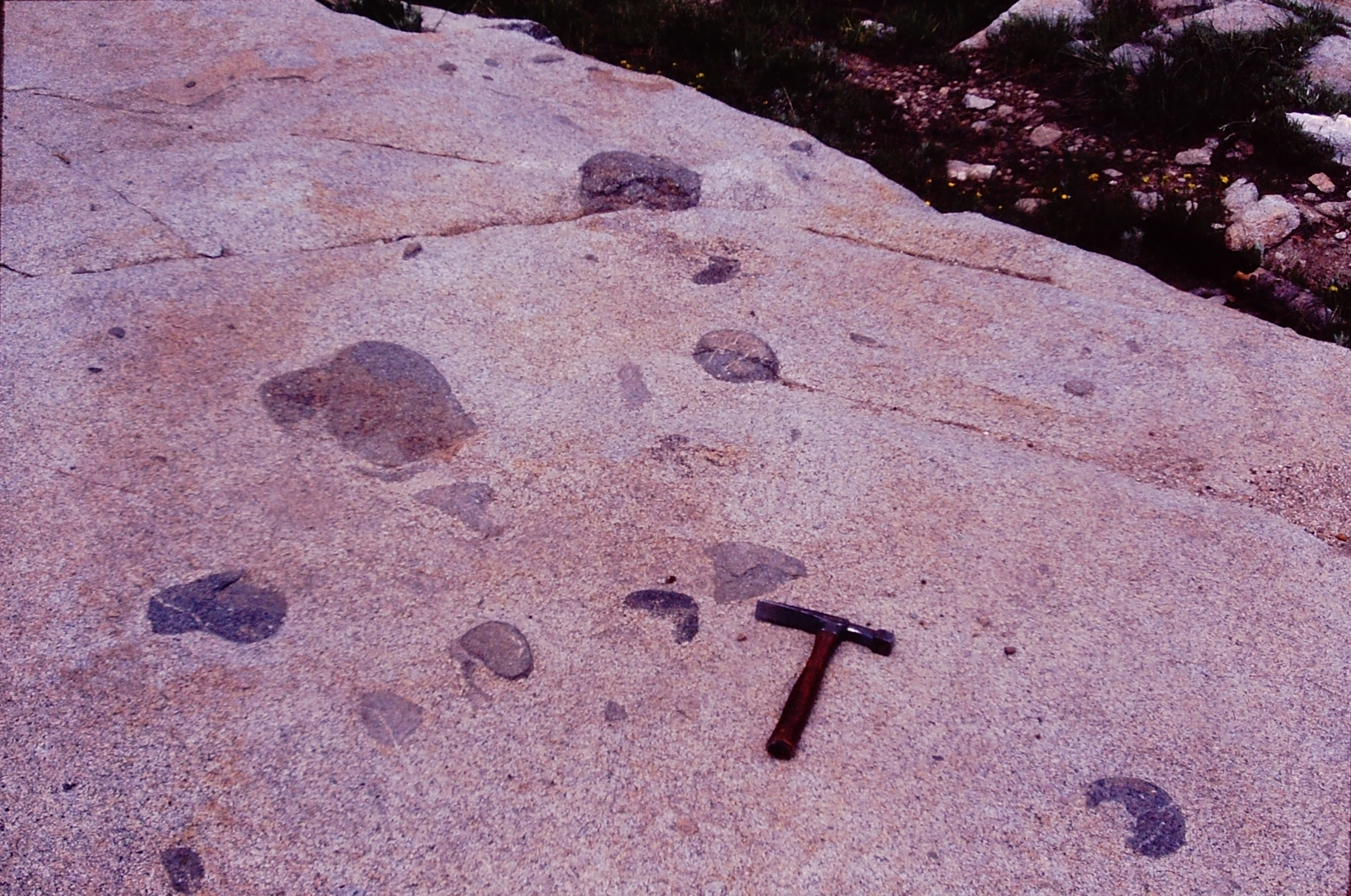
Xenoliths in granodiorite of the Alta Stock, Little Cottonwood Canyon, Utah

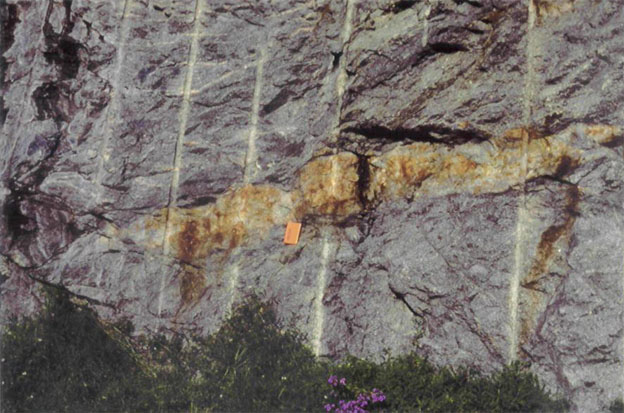
Large xenolith of sandstone (probably from the Albee Formation) within the Fairlee Pluton in Vermont

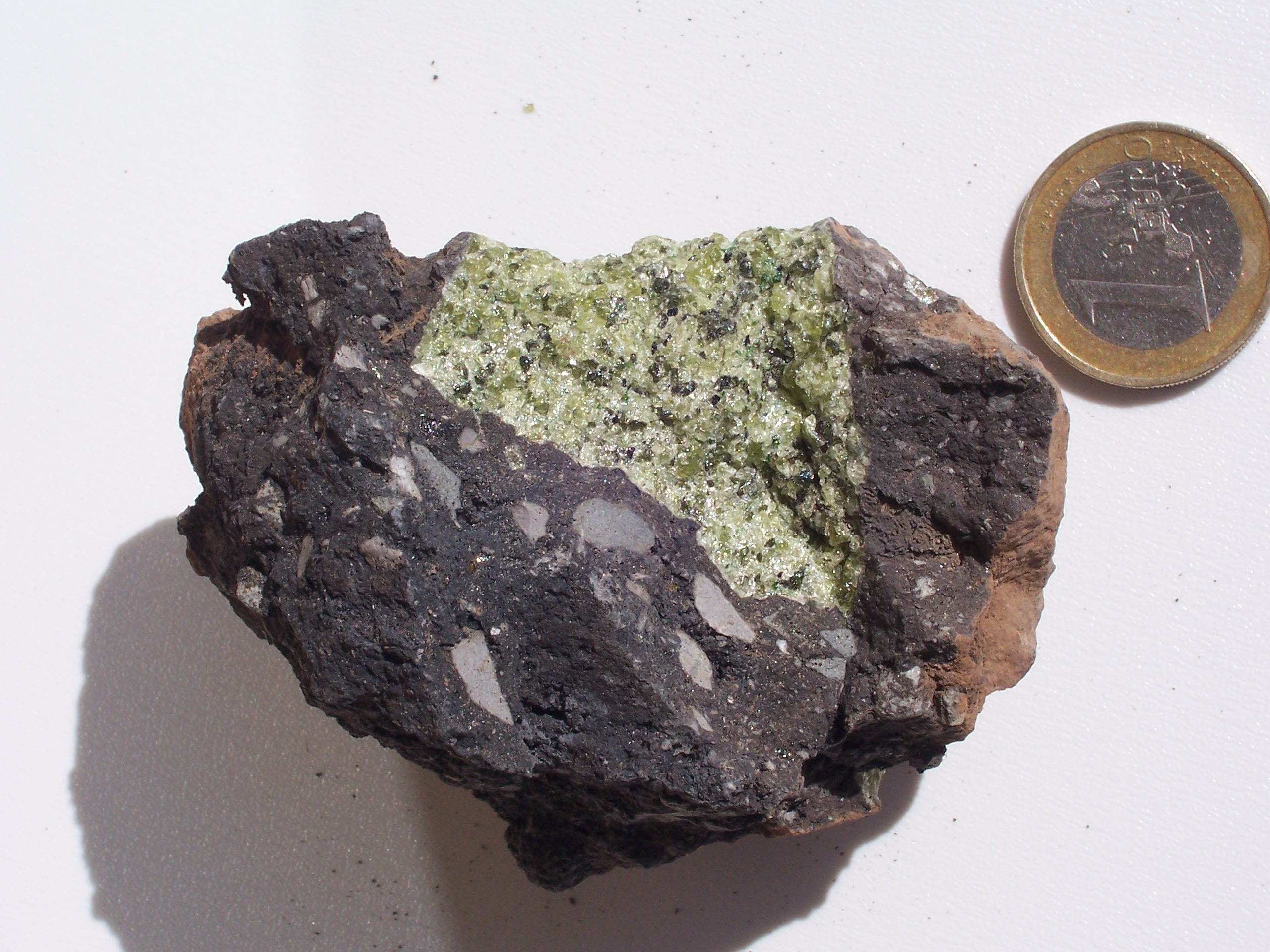
Peridotite (green) mantle xenolith within a (dark) volcanic bomb from Vulkaneifel, Germany (coin of one euro for scale)

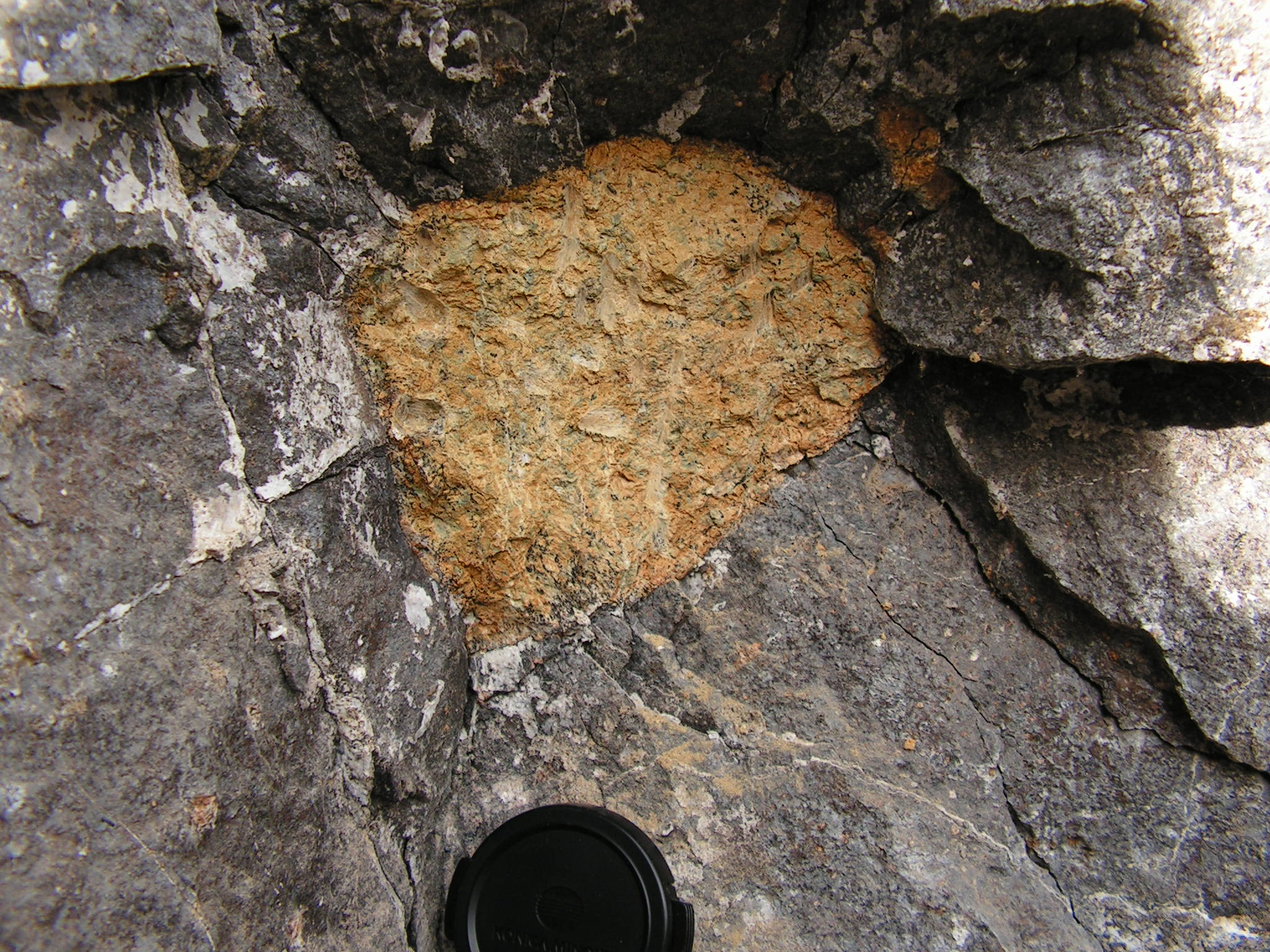
Rounded, yellow, weathered peridotite xenolith in a nephelinite lava flow at Kaiserstuhl, SW Germany

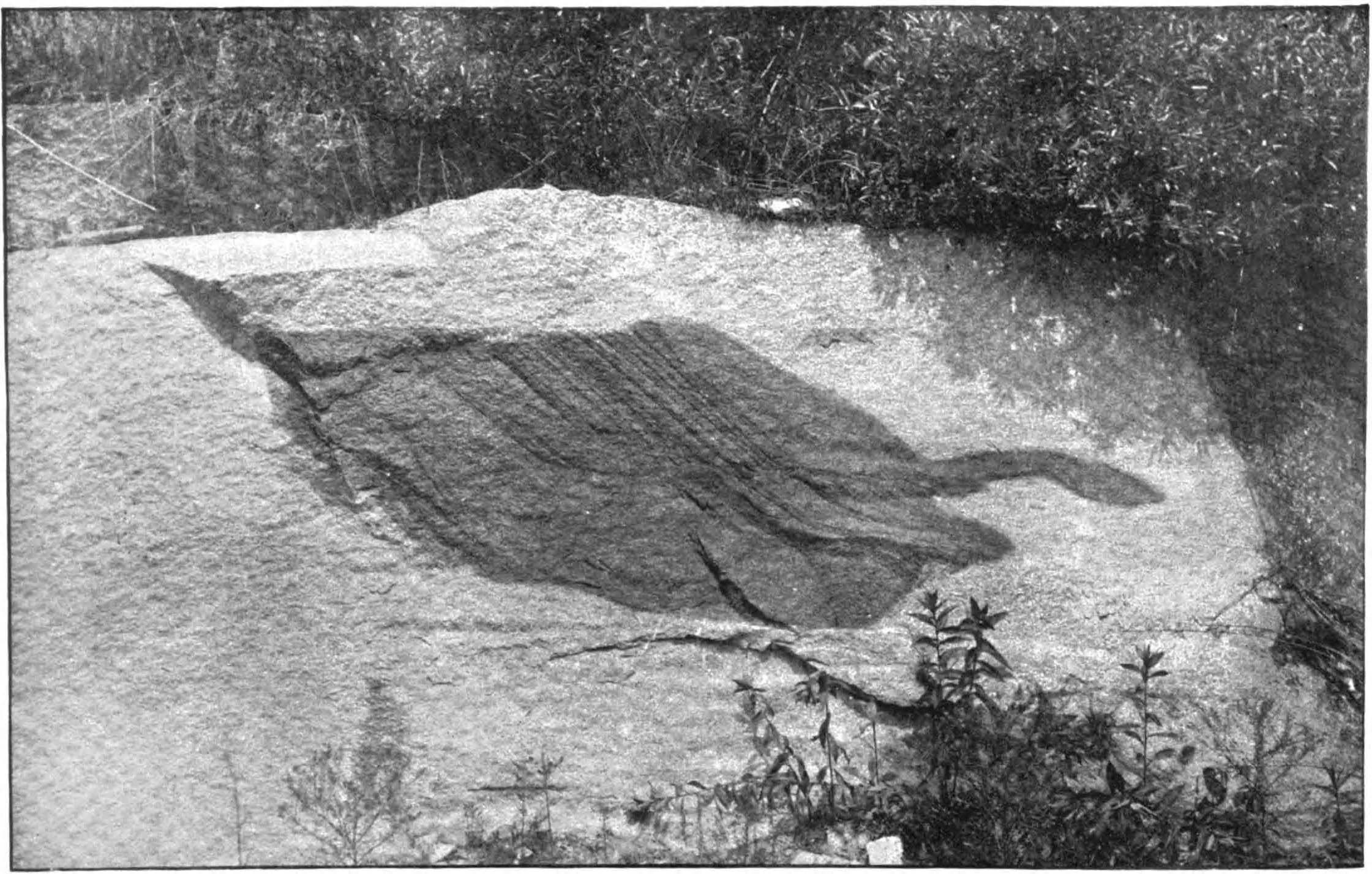
Large xenolith of Baltimore Gneiss in the Guilford Quartz Monzonite in a wall of the old Waltersville Quarry, Granite, Maryland (about 1895)

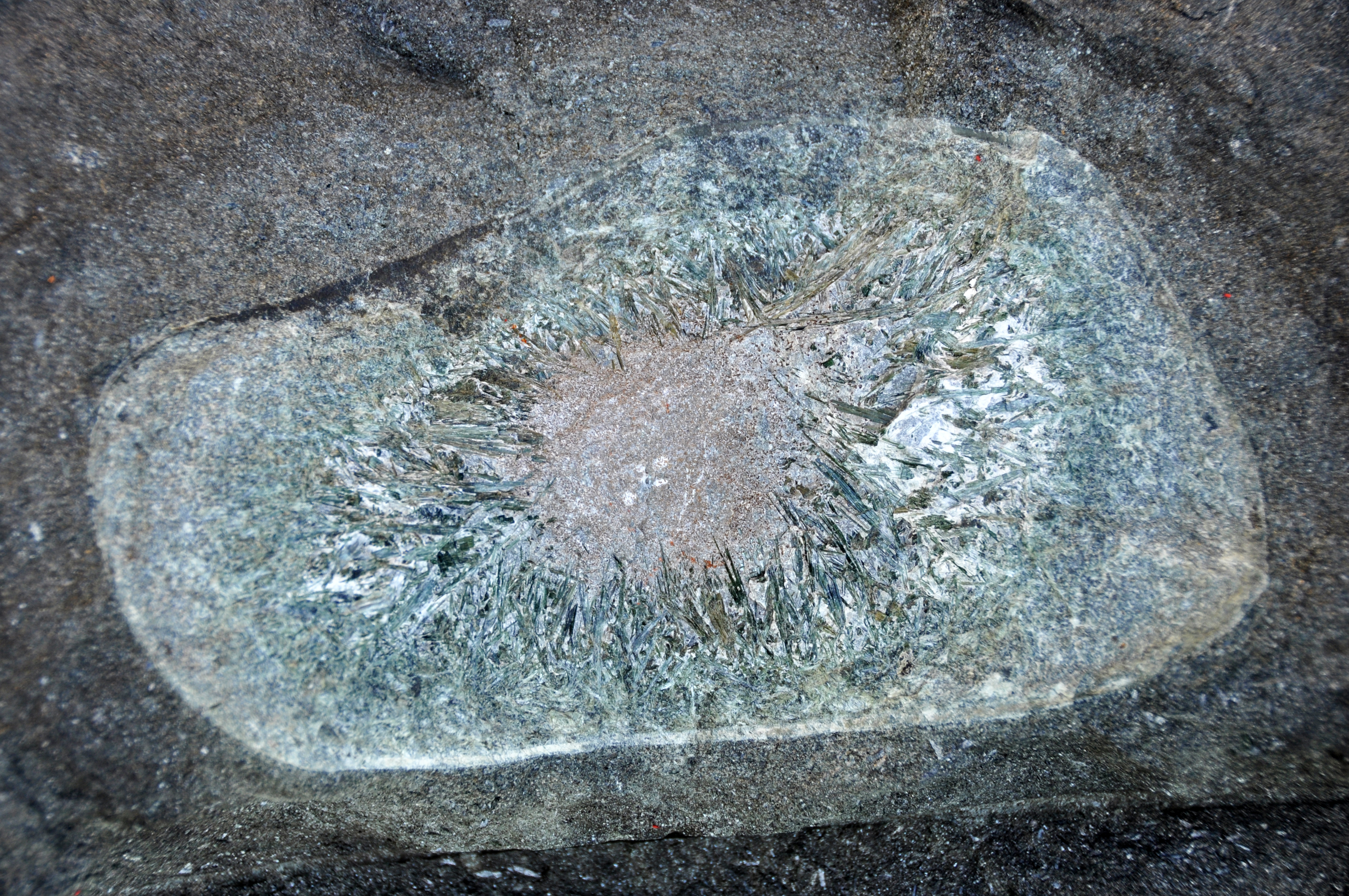
Lamprophyre with xenolith at Ontario, Canada.

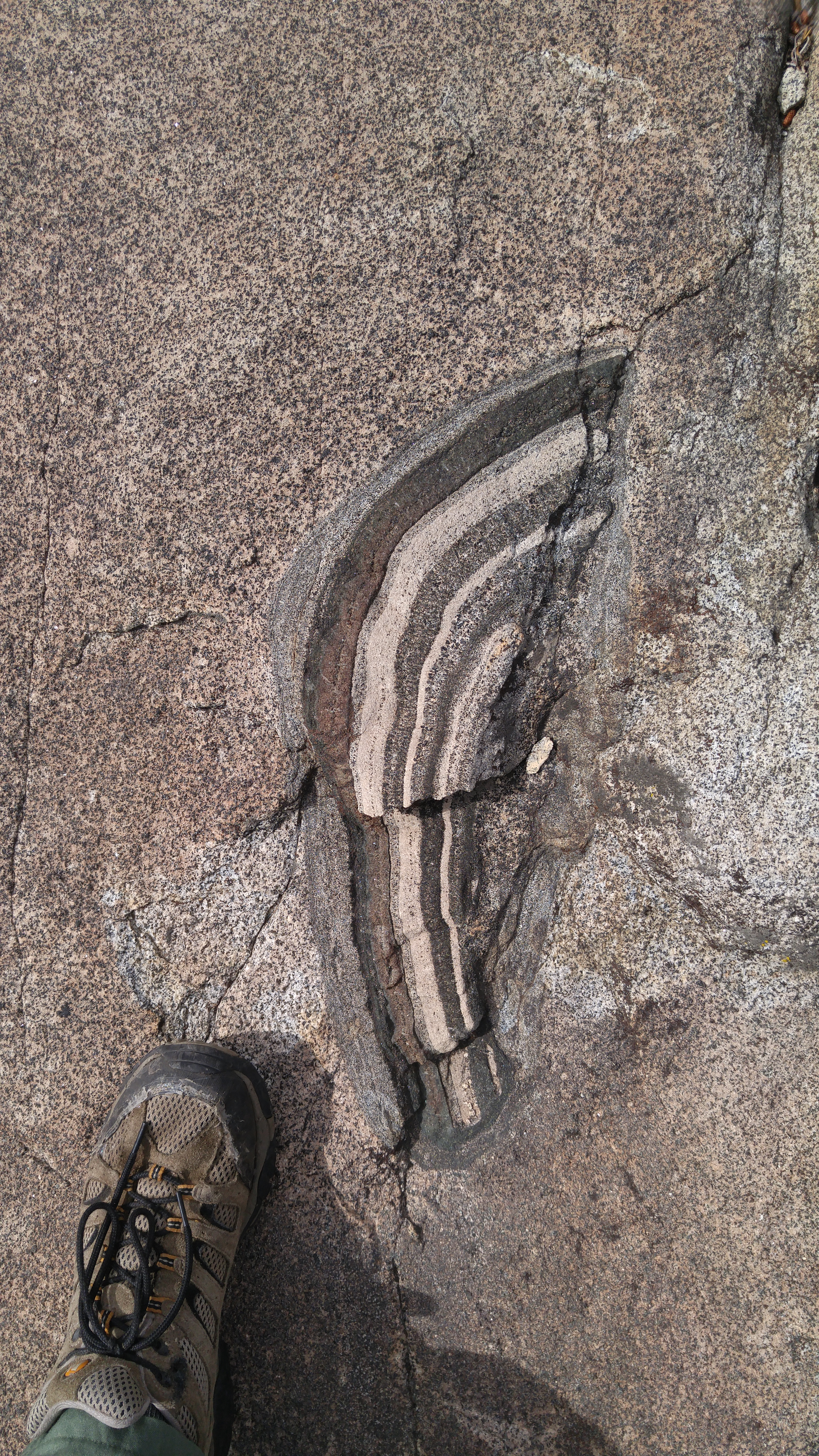
Xenolith in granite near Donner Pass, California (foot for scale).

== Sources ==
- Nixon, Peter H. (1987). Mantle Xenoliths. J. Wiley & Sons. ISBN 0-471-91209-3.
