= Fractional crystallization =

Fractional crystallization may refer to:

- Fractional crystallization (chemistry), a process to separate different solutes from a solution
- Fractional crystallization (geology), a natural process occurring in igneous rocks during which precipitation of minerals takes place
