= Iddingsite =

Common alteration product of olivine

- Igneous rock
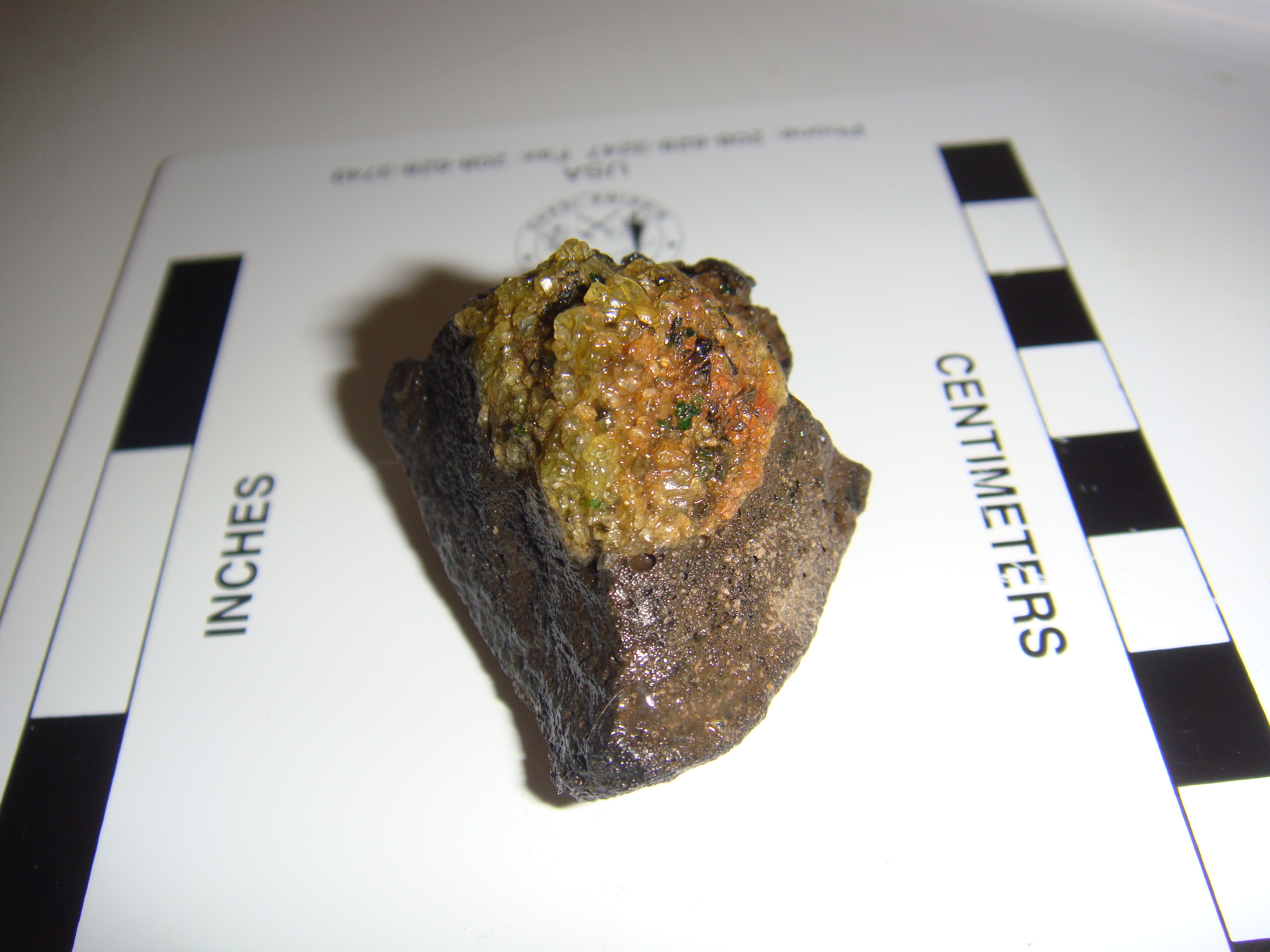
- Olivine (green) weathering to iddingsite (brown)

Composition
- Olivine, clays, ferrihydrites

Iddingsite is a microcrystalline igneous rock that is derived from alteration of olivine. It is usually studied as a mineral, and consists of a mixture of remnant olivine, clay minerals, iron oxides, and ferrihydrites. Debates over iddingsite's non-definite crystal structure caused it to be de-listed as an official mineral by the IMA; thus, it is properly referred to as a rock.

Iddingsite forms from the weathering of basalt in the presence of liquid water and can be described as a phenocryst, i.e. it has macroscopically visible crystals in a fine-grained groundmass of a porphyritic rock. It is a pseudomorph that has a composition that is constantly transforming from the original olivine, passing through many stages of structural and chemical change to create a fully altered iddingsite.

Because iddingsite is constantly transforming it does not have a definite structure or a definite chemical composition. The chemical formula for iddingsite has been approximated as MgO * Fe_{2}O_{3} * 3SiO_{2} * 4 H_{2}O where MgO can be substituted by CaO. The geologic occurrence of iddingsite is limited to extrusive or subvolcanic rocks that are formed by injection of magma near the surface. It is absent from deep-seated rocks and is found on meteorites. As it has been found on Martian meteorites, its ages have been calculated to obtain absolute ages when liquid water was at or near the surface of Mars.

It was named after Joseph P. Iddings, an American petrologist.

== Introduction ==
Iddingsite is a pseudomorph, and during the alteration process the olivine crystals had their internal structure or chemical composition changed, although the external form has been preserved. This is not true for all phases of the alteration of olivine because the atomic arrangement becomes distorted and causes a non-definite structure to form. Iddingsite has a composition that is constantly transforming from the original olivine passing through many stages of structural and chemical change.

Iddingsite has been a subject researched in recent years because of its presence in the Martian meteorites. The formation of iddingsite requires liquid water, giving scientists an estimate as to when there has been liquid water on Mars. Potassium-argon dating of the meteorite samples showed that Mars had water on its surface anywhere from 1300 Ma to 650 Ma ago.

== Composition ==
Iddingsite is a rock that lacks a definite chemical composition, so exact compositions cannot be calculated. An approximated composition for a hypothetical end product of iddingsite has been calculated as being SiO_{2} = 16%, Al_{2}O_{3} = 8%, Fe_{2}O_{3} = 62% and H_{2}O = 14%. Throughout the alteration process of olivine, there is a decrease in SiO_{2}, FeO and MgO and an increase in Al_{2}O_{3} and H_{2}O. The chemical process associated with the alteration consists of the addition of Fe_{2}O_{3} and the removal of MgO (Gay and Le Maitre 1961). The chemical formula for iddingsite is approximated as MgO * Fe_{2}O_{3} * 4 H_{2}O where MgO can be substituted by CaO by a ratio of 1:4. There are also some trace constituents of Na_{2}O and K_{2}O that enter iddingsite as the alteration process progresses.

== Geologic occurrence ==
The geologic occurrence of Iddingsite is limited to extrusive or hypabyssal rocks, and it is absent from deep-seated rocks. Iddingsite is an epimagmatic mineral derived during the final cooling of lava in which it occurs from a reaction between gases, water and olivine. The formation of iddingsite is not dependent on the original composition of the olivine. It is however dependent on oxidation conditions, hydration and the magma from which iddingsite forms must be rich in water vapor. The alteration of olivine to iddingsite occurs in a highly oxidizing environment under low pressure and at intermediate temperatures. Temperature needed for the alteration process has to be above temperatures that could cause the olivine to solidify, but below temperatures that would cause structural reorganization.

== Structure ==
The structure of iddingsite is difficult to characterize because of the complexity of the possible alterations that can occur from olivine. Iddingsite has the tendency to be optically homogeneous which indicates that there is some structural control. Structural rearrangements are controlled by hexagonal sequences of approximately close-packed oxygen sheets. These oxygen layers are perpendicular to the x-axis of an olivine cell. One of the close-packed directions is parallel to the z-axis of an olivine cell. These ion arrangements within olivine control the structural orientation of the alteration products. X-ray diffraction patterns found that there are five structural types of iddingsite that can occur during different stages of alteration. They are: olivine-like structures, goethite-like structures, hematite structures, spinel structures and silicate structures.

Olivine has an orthorhombic structure with a space group of Pbnm. Olivine-like structures represent the stage that breaks down olivine with chemical changes introduced by alterations. These structures have the cell dimensions a = 4.8, b = 10.3 and c = 6.0 Å, a space group Pbnm and a d-spacing of 2.779 Å. Olivine axes are oriented in the following way: a is parallel to X-axis, b is parallel to Y-axis and c is parallel to Z-axis. X-ray diffraction patterns taken from iddingsite vary from true olivine pattern to patterns that are very diffuse spots. This is an indication of a distorted structure caused by atomic replacement creating a distorted atomic arrangement.

Goethite-like structures are common because goethite is in the same space group as olivine. This allows for goethite to grow within the olivine making the close packed planes common for both structures. Goethite-like structures have cell dimensions a=4.6, b= 10.0 and c = 3.0 Å. Diffraction spots caused by goethite are diffuse even though the material is well oriented. These structures are aligned parallel to the original olivine with a-axis (goethite) parallel to a-axis (olivine), b-axis (goethite) parallel to b-axis (olivine) and c-axis (goethite) parallel to c-axis (olivine). The preferred orientation of olivine and goethite are when they are parallel with their z-axis.

Hematite-like structures occur in a similar fashion as goethite. Hematite has a triangular crystal system and experiences twinning by having an approximately hexagonal close-packed oxygen framework and has a structural orientation similar to olivine. When twinning occurs, the orientation of hematite-like iddingsite is as follows: a-axis of olivine is parallel to the c-axis of hematite, the b-axis of olivine is parallel to the +/− [010] plane of hematite and the c-axis of olivine is parallel to the +/− [210] plane of hematite. This hematite structure is very well oriented and occurs because of the high stability of the anion framework and because the cations can be made to migrate throughout the structure.

Spinel structures consist of multiple oxide structures that are cubic and have cubic close packing. The spinel structures have a twined orientation and are controlled by close packed sheets. This twined orientation is can be described as: the a-axis of olivine is parallel to the (111) spinel face. The b-axis of olivine is parallel to +/− (112) and the c-axis of olivine is parallel to +/− (110) spinel face. These alterations tend to be rare in iddingsite but when they are present they show a sharp diffraction spot making them easily identified.

Silicate structures are the most variable among all of the structures discussed. A common silicate structure consists of a hexagonal array of cylinders whose length is parallel to the x-axis of the olivine and the side of the hexagonal cell is parallel to the z-axis of olivine. Diffraction effects caused by this structure can be attributed to the formation of sheet silicate structures that have a very disordered stacking of layers.

== Physical properties ==
Iddingsite is a pseudomorph that usually has crystals rimmed by a thin zone of yellowish brown or greenish cryptocrystalline material. The color of iddingsite varies from red-brown to orange-brown to deep ruby red to orange-red. The color of iddingsite in plane polarized light is the same until the later alteration stages when it turns into a darker color due to the strengthening effect of pleochroism. An increase in beta refractive index, which typically is 1.9 can be seen in most types of iddingsite, as the alteration process proceeds. Iddingsite also exhibits an increase in birefringence and dispersion as the alteration process proceeds.

Some samples that have completed their alterations have miscellaneous cleavage thereby making it not a very good diagnostic tool. Most samples have no cleavage at all. Thin sections from an occurrence near Lismore, New South Wales, Australia, have a lamellar habit with one well developed cleavage and two subsidiary cleavages at right angles to each other. It has an alpha of 1.7 to 1.68 and a gamma of 1.71 to 1.72 and a birefringence of 0.04. On average iddingsite has a density of approximately 2.65 g/cm^{3} and a hardness of 3 (calcite). Variability in these values are expected due to the differences in crystal structure that can occur from different stages in the alteration process.

== Additional sources ==
- Borg Lars, Drake Michaels. "A review of meteorite evidence for the timing of magmatism and of surface or near-surface liquid water on Mars". Journal of Geophysical Research. Vol. 110, E12S03, pp. 1–10, 2005.
- Eggeton, Richard. "Formation of Iddingsite Rims on Olivine: a Transmission Electron Microscope Study". Clays and Clay Minerals, Col. 32. No. 1, 1–11, 1984.
- Smith, Katherine et al. "Weathering of Basalt: Formation of Iddingsite". Clays and Clay Minerals, Col. 35. No. 6, pp. 418–428, 1987.
- Sun Ming Shan. "The Nature of Iddingsite in Some Basaltic Rocks of New Mexico". American *Mineralogist. 42; pp. 7–8, 1957.
