= Bytownite =

Plagioclase feldspar with 70–90% anorthite

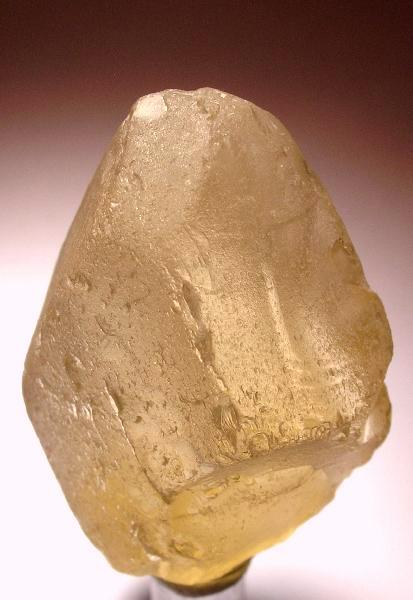
- A somewhat rounded, alluvial crystal of bytownite from the Dorado Mine, Casas Grandes, Chihuahua, Mexico (size 3.7 × 2 × 1.3 cm)

General
- Category: Tectosilicate minerals
- Group: Feldspar group
- Series: Plagioclase feldspar series
- Formula: (Ca,Na)[Al(Al,Si)Si_{2}O_{8}] (Na:Ca = 10:90 to 30:70)
- IMA status: Variety of anorthite
- Strunz classification: 9.FA.35
- Dana classification: 76.01.03.05
- Crystal system: Triclinic
- Crystal class: Pinacoidal (1̅)
- Space group: P1̅ (no. 2)
- Unit cell: a = 8.178 Å, b = 12.870 Å, c = 14.187 Å; α = 93:5°, β = 115:9°, γ = 90:63°; Z = 8

Identification
- Color: Colorless, white, gray
- Crystal habit: Rarely as crystals flattened on [010], commonly as cleavable masses or anhedral grains in massive aggregates
- Twinning: Common Albite, Carlsbad, and Pericline twinning
- Cleavage: Perfect on [001], good on [010], imperfect on [110]
- Fracture: Uneven to conchoidal
- Tenacity: Brittle
- Mohs scale hardness: 6 – 6.5
- Luster: Vitreous, pearly on cleavages
- Streak: White
- Diaphaneity: Transparent to translucent
- Specific gravity: 2.72 – 2.74
- Optical properties: Biaxial (+/−)
- Refractive index: n_{α} = 1.563 – 1.572 n_{β} = 1.568 – 1.578 n_{γ} = 1.573 – 1.583
- Birefringence: δ = 0.010 – 0.011
- 2V angle: Measured: 86°, Calculated: 80° to 88°
- Dispersion: r > v strong

Bytownite is a calcium rich member of the plagioclase solid solution series of feldspar minerals with composition between anorthite and labradorite. It is usually defined as having between 70 and 90%An (formula: (Ca_{0.7−0.9}Na_{0.3−0.1})[Al(Al,Si)Si_{2}O_{8}]). Like others of the series, bytownite forms grey to white triclinic crystals commonly exhibiting the typical plagioclase twinning and associated fine striations.

The specific gravity of bytownite varies between 2.74 and 2.75. The refractive indices ranges are nα=1.563 – 1.572, nβ=1.568 – 1.578, and nγ=1.573 – 1.583. Precise determination of these two properties with chemical, X-ray diffraction, or petrographic analysis are required for identification.

== Occurrence ==
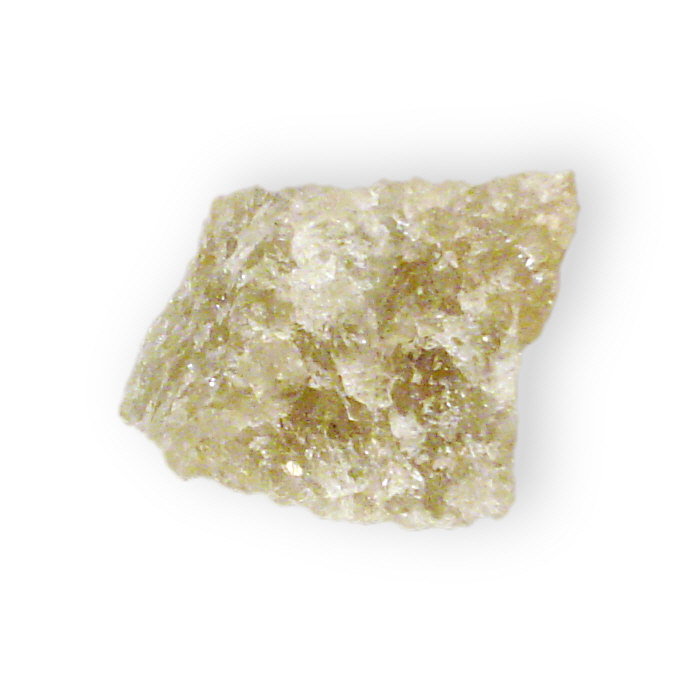
Bytownite from Crystal Bay, Minnesota

Bytownite is a rock forming mineral occurring in mafic igneous rocks such as gabbros and anorthosites. It also occurs as phenocrysts in mafic volcanic rocks. It is rare in metamorphic rocks. It is typically associated with pyroxenes and olivine.

The mineral was first described in 1836 and named for an occurrence at Bytown (now Ottawa), Canada. Other noted occurrences in Canada include the Shawmere anorthosite in Foleyet Township, Ontario, and on Yamaska Mountain, near Abbotsford, Quebec. It occurs on Rùm island, Scotland and Eycott Hill, near Keswick, Cumberland, England. It is reported from Naaraodal, Norway and in the Bushveld complex of South Africa. It is also found in Isa Valley, Western Australia.

In the US it is found in the Stillwater igneous complex of Montana; from near Lakeview, Lake County, Oregon. It occurs in the Lucky Cuss mine, Tombstone, Arizona; and from the Grants district, McKinley County, New Mexico. In the eastern US it occurs at Cornwall, Lebanon County, Pennsylvania and Phoenixville, Chester County, Pennsylvania.
