= Dwars River Geological Occurrence =

Geological formation in South Africa

The Dwars River Geological Occurrence, also called Dwars River Chromite Geosite, is a Provincial Heritage Site at the Dwars River in the Eastern Limb of the Bushveld Igneous Complex in Limpopo province of South Africa.

== Location ==
The Dwars River Chromite Geosite (Inventory Number 2430CC1) is located in the eastern limb of the Bushveld igneous complex in Limpopo and popularly known for its Upper Group (UG1) chromatite outcrop. It is located in the Steelport area of Burgersfort town. It was declared a natural monument on 22 January 1965 as a "unique occurrence of chromitite bands in anorthosite, of great scientific importance". The river connects to the Klein-Dwars River, which feeds into the Richmond dam, stretching through to the St George River through the Limpopo-Mpumalanga boundary. Geographically, the River is near Platinum Group mines such as the Mototolo complex, Two Rivers platinum mine, and Dwars River platinum mine.

== Geological setting ==
The Dwars River Geological Occurrence is located in the Bushveld igneous complex (BIC) associated with commodities such as palladium, platinum, rhodium, chromium, and vanadium known as Platinum group elements (PGE's). This complex is a large Igneous Province (LIP) that is thought to be about 2 Ga old. It is mostly made up of mafic and ultramafic rocks that were crystallized during a brief period of geological time roughly less than 10 Ma as a result of multiple magma injections and is the largest contributor of platinum group minerals (PGMs) in the world, while playing a crucial role in the economy of South Africa. BIC is around 65,000 km^{2} in size and is divided into limbs, namely, the Northern limb, the Southern limb, the Western limb, and the Eastern limb. The Rustenburg layered suite, as the rich layer of the complex, is deposited between the Transvaal Supergroup and the Rooiberg group. Numerous rock types, such as pyroxenites, gabbronorites, anorthosites, and chromitites, make up the BIC. These rocks are abundant in minerals, including chromite, magnetite, pyroxene, and olivine. This complex's key mineralizations include the Marenskey Reef, UG2 and the Plaat Reef of the northern limb.

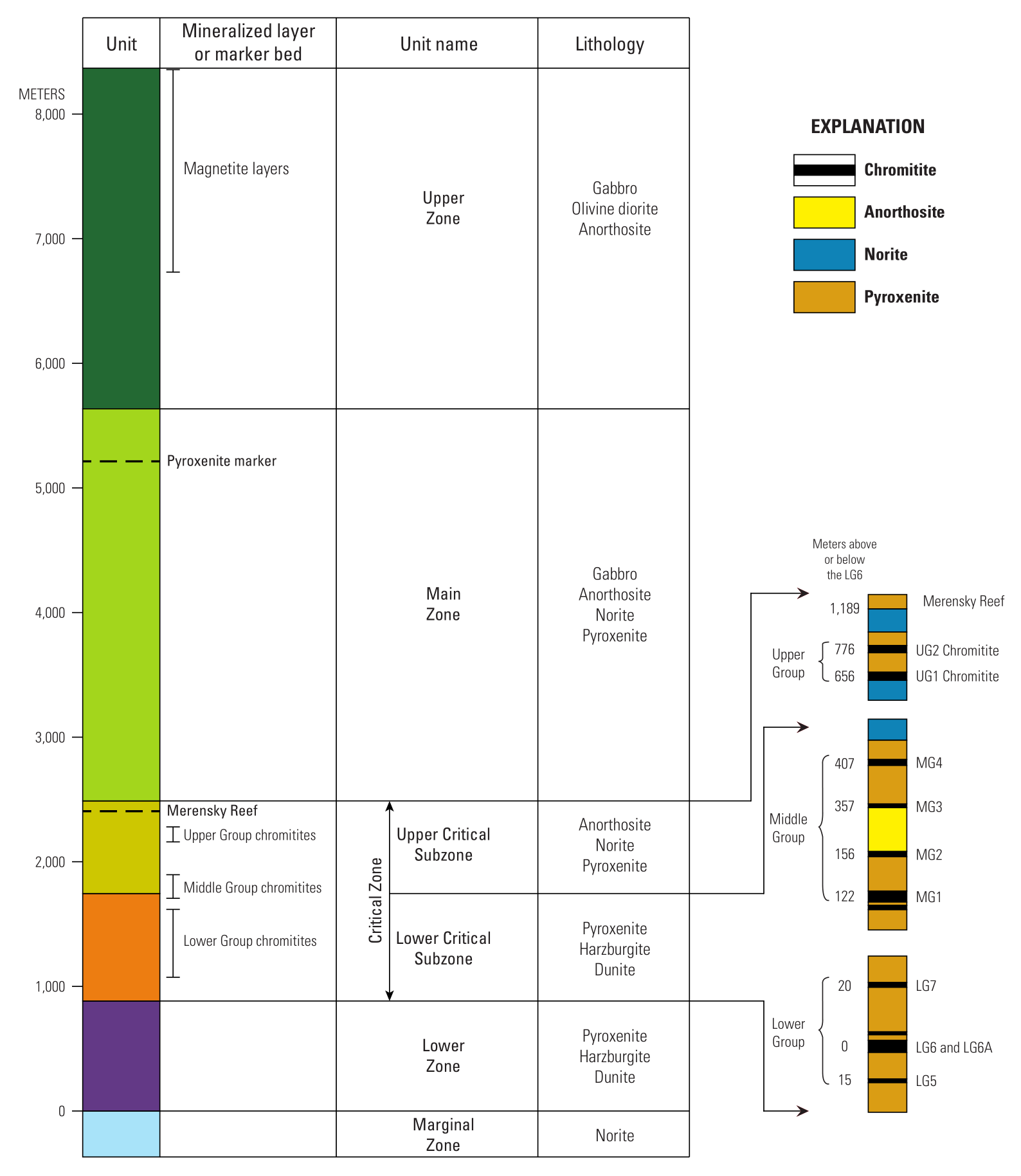
Stratigraphic unit of the Bushveld igneous complex

== Stratigraphy ==
The Dwars River is located within the Rustenburg layered suite (RLS) of the BIC, which is the main contributor of commodities within the BIC. The suite is divided into various zones namely, the upper zone, the Main zone, the Critical zone and the lower zone. Whilst the upper and the Main zones are less exploited due to their lack of PGMs, the critical zone is the most exploited as it is the source of the PGMs. In the upper critical zone more PGMs than chrome occur within the marenskey reef and the UG reef, while the lower is being extracted for chrome only.

== Occurrence of the Dwars River Geosite ==
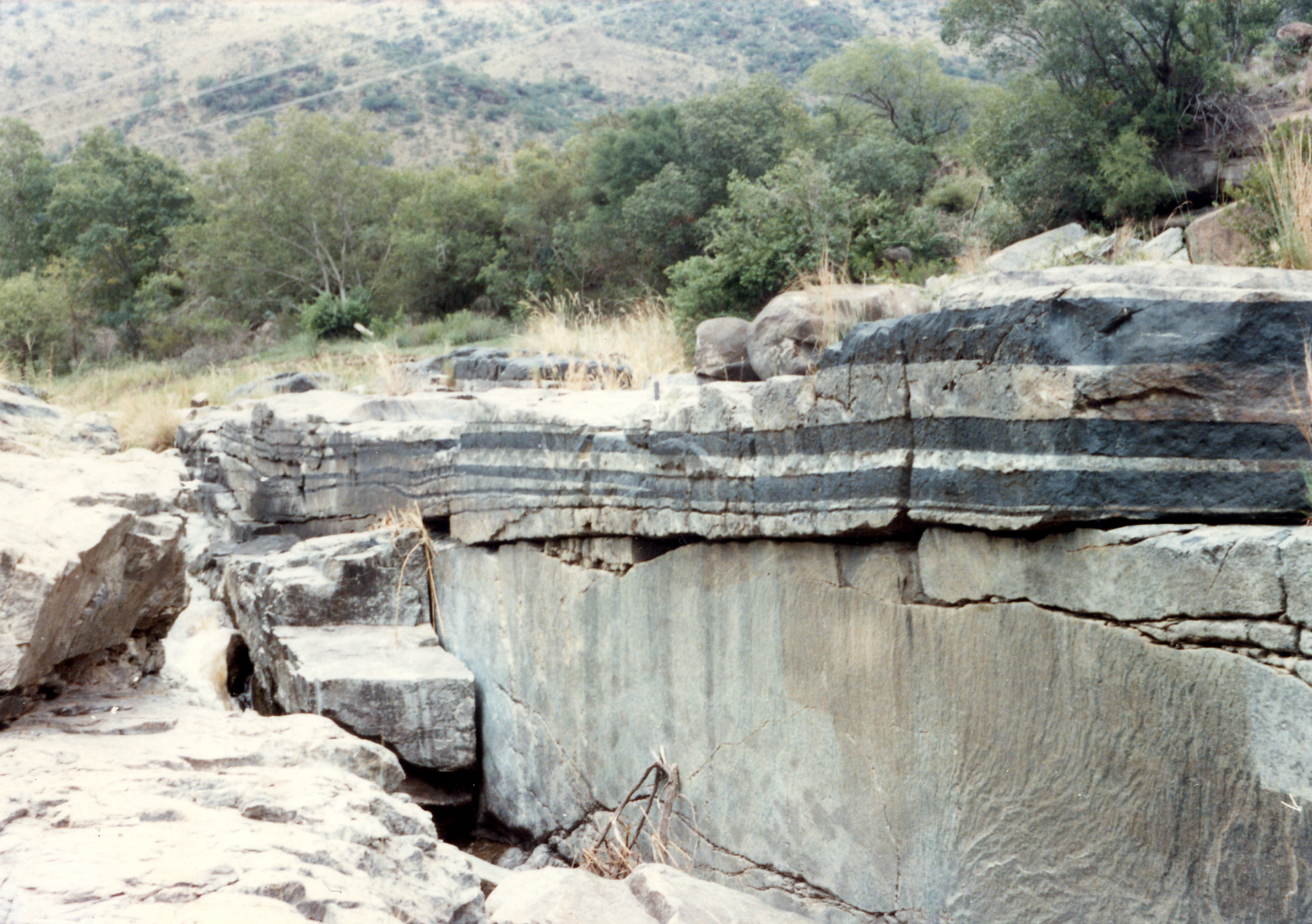
UG1 chromatite outcrop of the Dwars River

Dwars River occurs on the (upper group 1) UG1 above the UG2 within the critical zones of the RLS. UG1 chromitites, housed in politic anorthosites and forming an anastomosing network of many layers, have previously been described by mechanisms related to depositional, erosional, and intrusive processes. A turbulent magmatic density stream emplacement into the developing chamber caused the UG1 chromitites to form. This hybrid melt precipitated chromite, which created a succession of slurries loaded with chromite that flowed in the turbulent stream and split (or "bifurcated") when they passed around rising buoyant plagioclase diapirs that were forming behind the current. It is hypothesized that a substantial magma influx and related seismicity may have triggered the liquefaction of the unconsolidated footwall anorthosite. This produced formations resembling liquefaction-related sedimentary features, such as sand volcanoes or boils. Where there is "background sedimentation" of chromite along with periodic extrusion of plagioclase plus magma slurry at the magma cumulate pile contact, chromite layers bifurcate. A UG-1 chromitite layer approximately 2 m thick was formed when the chromite slurries mixed in the current's tail and finally returned, injecting themselves into the deposited plagioclase cumulates on the chamber floor.
