= Stillwater igneous complex =

Large mass of igneous rock in Montana, containing metal ore deposits

Coordinates: 45.3861°N 109.9031°W

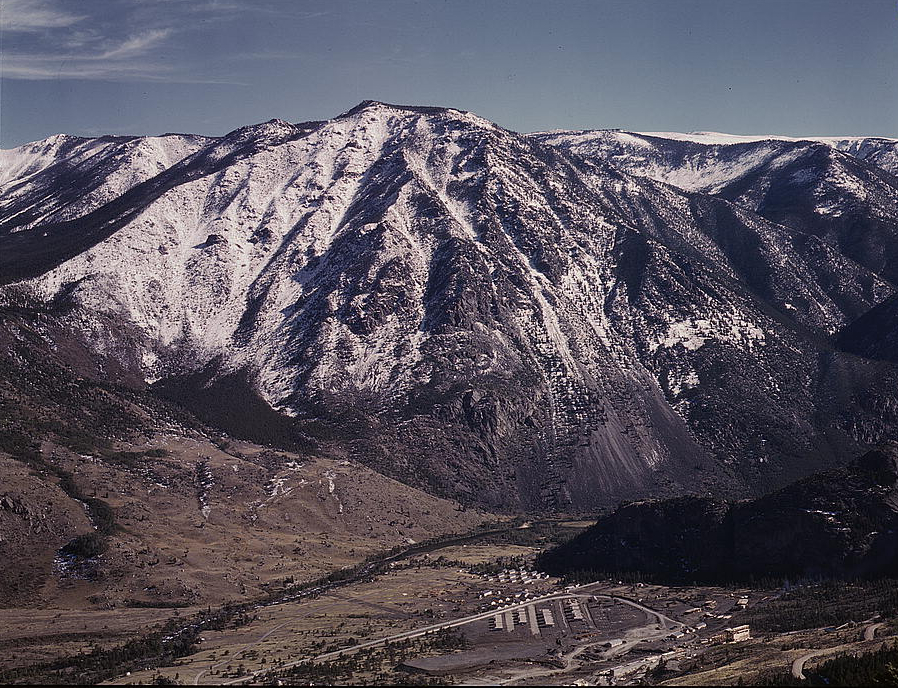
Stillwater igneous complex around Mouat chromite mine

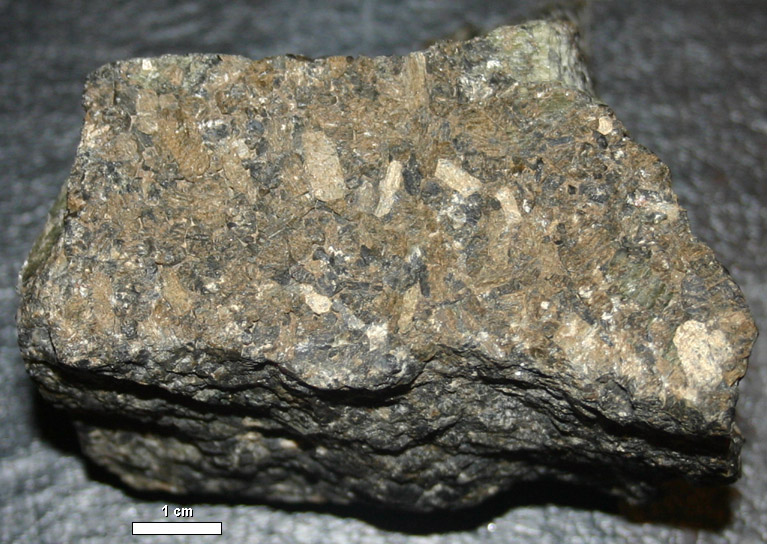
Chromitite with bronzite phenocrysts from Stillwater Igneous Complex

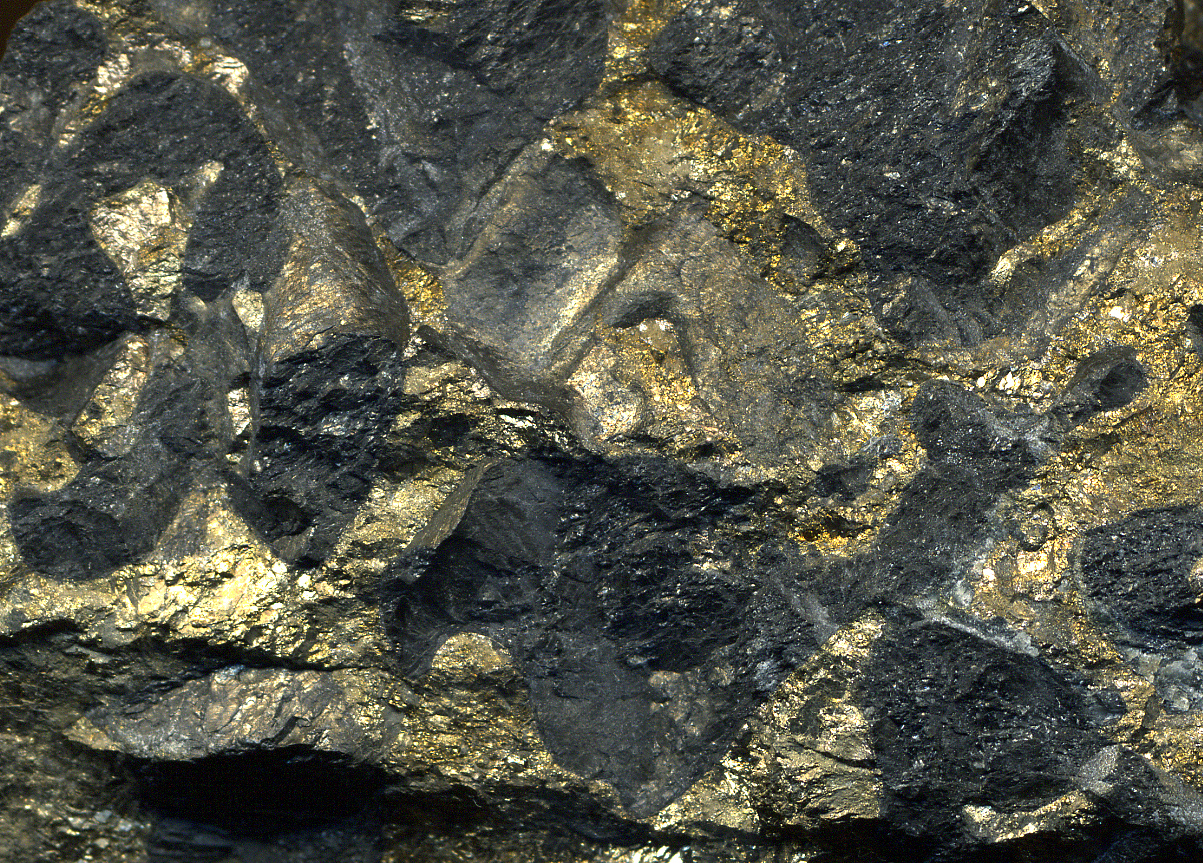
Sulfidic serpentintite, platinum-palladium ore from the Stillwater Mine. This is an altered pegmatitic dunite very richly infused with intercumulate Pt/Pd-rich chalcopyrite & pyrrhotite (golden metallic minerals). In this sample, the blackish areas are serpentine masses (formerly large olivine crystals). Some magnetite is also mixed in with the serpentine. Ore grade is about 2.5 ounces of Pd-Pt per ton of rock, with a Pd-Pt ratio of about 3:1.

The Stillwater igneous complex is a large layered mafic intrusion (LMI) located in southern Montana in Stillwater, Sweet Grass and Park Counties. The complex is exposed across 30 miles (48 km) of the north flank of the Beartooth Mountain Range. The complex has extensive reserves of chromium ore and has a history of being mined for chromium. More recent mining activity has produced palladium and other platinum group elements.

== Geology ==
The Stillwater complex is a large layered intrusion with many similarities to the Bushveld igneous complex of South Africa. The complex was intruded into existing gneisses during the Archean at about 2.7 Ga. Host rocks on the northern side are Archean sedimentary rocks while the southern boundary includes Precambrian rocks of granite, granite gneiss and schist. The Precambrian rock on its southern side is mostly provided by the Beartooth Mountains. The region had a quartz monzonite intrusion and underwent extensive metamorphism, faulting and folding during the Archean at about 2.5 Ga. The area was intruded by north trending mafic dikes before being unconformably covered by a middle-Cambrian sedimentary rock sequence. The intrusion forms a linear body stretching some 30 miles (48 km) and striking roughly N 60 °W and dipping from 50° to near 90° to the northeast. The exposed thickness is around 18,000 feet (5500 m) with an additional estimated 5,000 to 15,000 feet (1524 to 4572 m) having been removed from the top by pre-Cambrian erosion.

The cumulate stratigraphy comprises three distinct zones:

- The Basal series consists of a chilled fine grained gabbro overlain by gabbro, norite and feldspar pyroxenites. Thickness up to 700 feet (210 m).
- The Ultramafic series is composed of a lower peridotite member (Peridotite zone) consisting of alternating dunite, chromitite, harzburgite and bronzite pyroxenite. The upper third is massive, monotonous bronzitite (Bronzitite zone). The Ultramafic series averages around 3500 feet (1100 m) in thickness.
- The Banded series is composed of alternating norite, gabbro and anorthosite. The Banded series has a maximum thickness of 14,000 feet (4300 m).

=== IUGS geological heritage site ===
In respect of it being 'one of the world's oldest layered intrusions, containing the world's highest-grade platinum-group element deposit', the International Union of Geological Sciences (IUGS) included 'The Stillwater Complex' in its assemblage of 100 'geological heritage sites' around the world in a listing published in October 2022. The organisation defines an IUGS Geological Heritage Site as 'a key place with geological elements and/or processes of international scientific relevance, used as a reference, and/or with a substantial contribution to the development of geological sciences through history.'

== Orebodies ==
The chromium orebodies are restricted to the Peridotite zone of the Ultramafic series. The platinum group orebody is located in the lower part of the Banded series within a horizon referred to as the J-M Reef.

The J-M Reef is similar to the Merensky Reef of the Bushveld complex of South Africa. It is a continuous layer near the base of the banded zone. It consists of one to three meter thick pegmatitic peridotite and troctolite with disseminated sulfide minerals. Common sulfides include pyrrhotite, pentlandite (containing up to 5% Pd), and chalcopyrite along with lesser amounts of moncheite ((Pt,Pd)(Te,Bi)_{2}), cooperite ((Pt,Pd,Ni)S), braggite ((Pt,Pd,Ni)S), kotulskite (Pd(Te,Bi)_{1–2}) and platinum-iron alloys. Overall the reef contains an average of 20-25 ppm platinum plus palladium in an average two meter thickness. It has a Pd/Pt ratio of about 3.6.

== Astronaut training ==
In July 1972, the area was used by NASA to geologically train the Apollo Astronauts in recognizing a coarse grained igneous intrusion. Astronauts who would use this training on the Moon included Apollo 16's John Young and Apollo 17's Gene Cernan and Jack Schmitt. Notable geologist instructors included William R. Muehlberger.

== See also ==
- Stillwater Mining Company
