= Marula mine =

Platinum mine in Limpopo, South Africa

- Location in South Africa
- Location: Limpopo, South Africa; 24.502547°S 30.071713°E
- Products: platinum, palladium, rhodium, ruthenium
- Production: ZAR 1.2 billion (gross profit)
- Financial year: June 2019
- Opened: 2002
- Company: Implats - 73% 3 BEE partners - 27%

The Marula Mine is a platinum mine located in the Limpopo province of South Africa. It is in the eastern limb of the Bushveld Igneous Complex, approximately 35km north-west of Burgersfort. The operation comprises two decline shaft systems which are used to access the UG2 reef.

In the 2018 financial year the concentrator plant at Marula mine produced 85 100 oz of platinum, which was processed at Impala Platinum's Mineral Processes in the town Rustenburg. Marula mine had an estimated reserve of 10.6 million oz of platinum in 2018. The labourforce comprised almost 4000 workers in 2018.

== History ==
Platinum was discovered in 1920 by Hans Merensky in the area of the current Modikwa mine. In 1988, Impala Platinum acquired the mineral rights to the Winnarshoek farm from the Canadian company, Platexco. They later acquired rights to the farms Clapham and Forest Hill. The establishment of the mine started in October 2002 subsequent to the drilling of 750 exploratory boreholes.

== Geology of the mine ==
The mine holds mining rights to 5 494 hectares within the Bushveld Igneous Complex, comprising the farms Winnarshoek, Clapham and Forest Hill, as well as a royalty agreement with Modikwa mine which allows it access to additional area. In this region there is a separation of approximately 400m between the Merensky Reef and UG2 reef, both of which decline to the west-southwest at 12 to 14 degrees. Potholes and a dunite pipe are present within the area and result in geological losses.

== Mining ==
Both conventional mining methods ("footwall drives below the reef horizon with crosscut breakaways") and hybrid mining methods ("breast mining on the reef from a single gully") are employed at Marula.

== Ownership ==
Marula mine is 73% owned by Impala Platinum with the remaining 27% split equally between three Black Economic Empowerment partners, namely:

- The Marula Community Trust, a local community trust,
- Tubatse Platinum, an empowerment consortium of local businesses, and
- Mmakau Mining, an established, black-owned mining company.

== COVID-19 closure ==
On 16 May 2020, Impala Platinum announced that it was temporarily shutting Marula mine, owing to a cluster of COVID-19 cases in the area. There were 19 positive cases identified in the area. Fourteen of these were Marula mine workers who lived locally and had been tested by the mine after they had returned to the mine once the lockdown regulations in South Africa had allowed them to return to work. They had not started working at the mine yet.
