= Thaba mine =

Chromium mine in South Africa

- Location: Thabazimbi, Limpopo, South Africa
- Products: Chromium

The Thaba mine is an open cast mine in the northwestern Bushveld Igneous Complex of South Africa near Thabazimbi in Limpopo. The Thaba Mines proven chromitite reserves amount to 23.6 million tonnes of ore grading 43.6% chromium. The 23.6 million tonnes of ore contains 10.3 million tonnes of chromium metal.
