= Layered intrusion =

Large sill-like body of igneous rock

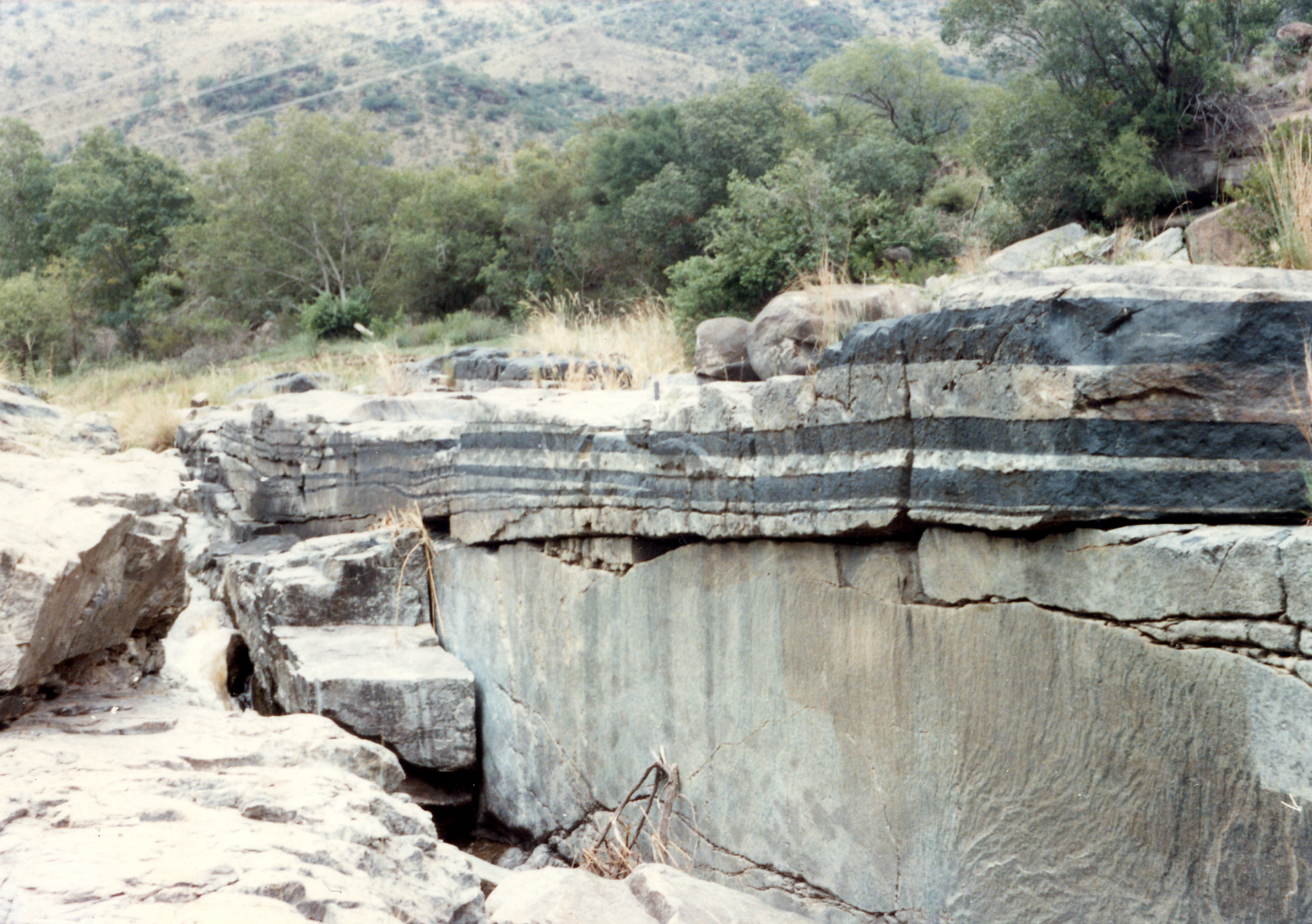
Chromitite and anorthosite layered igneous rocks in Critical Zone UG1 of the Bushveld Igneous Complex at the Mononono River outcrop, near Steelpoort, South Africa

A layered intrusion is a large sill-like body of igneous rock which exhibits horizontal layering or differences in composition and texture. These intrusions can be many kilometres in area covering from around 100 km^{2} (39 sq mi) to over 50,000 km^{2} (19,000 sq mi) and several hundred metres to over one kilometre (3,300 ft) in thickness. While most layered intrusions are Archean to Proterozoic in age (for example, the Paleoproterozoic Bushveld complex), they may be any age such as the Cenozoic Skaergaard intrusion of east Greenland or the Rum layered intrusion in Scotland. Although most are ultramafic to mafic in composition, the Ilimaussaq intrusive complex of Greenland is an alkalic intrusion.

Layered intrusions are typically found in ancient cratons and are rare but worldwide in distribution. The intrusive complexes exhibit evidence of fractional crystallization and crystal segregation by settling or floating of minerals from a melt.

Ideally, the stratigraphic sequence of an ultramafic-mafic intrusive complex consists of ultramafic peridotites and pyroxenites with associated chromitite layers toward the base with more mafic norites, gabbros and anorthosites in the upper layers. Some include diorite, and granophyre near the top of the bodies. Orebodies of nickel-copper-platinum group elements (Ni-Cu-PGE), chromite, magnetite, and ilmenite are often associated with base metal sulfide mineral assemblages within these rare intrusions. Often overlooked is that economically significant Ni-Cu-PGE deposits can occur in the country rock spatially associated with the layered intrusion.

== Intrusive behaviour and setting ==
Mafic-ultramafic layered intrusions occur at all levels within the crust, from depths in excess of 50 km (160,000 ft) to depths of as little as 1.5–5 km (5,000–16,000 ft). The depth at which an intrusion is formed is dependent on several factors:

- Density of the melt. Magmas with high magnesium and iron contents are denser and are therefore less likely to be able to reach the surface.
- Interfaces within the crust. Typically, a horizontal detachment zone, a dense, impermeable layer or even a lithological interface may provide a horizontal plane of weakness which the ascending magma will exploit, forming a sill or lopolith.
- Temperature and viscosity. As an ascending magma rises and cools, it becomes thicker and more viscous. This then restricts the magma from rising further because more energy is required to push it upwards. But thicker magma is also more efficient at forcing apart the wall rocks, creating volume which the magma may fill.

== Intrusive mechanisms ==
It is difficult to precisely determine what causes large ultramafic – mafic intrusives to be emplaced within the crust, but there are two main hypotheses: plume magmatism and rift upwelling.

=== Plume magmatism ===
The plume magmatism theory is based on observations that most large igneous provinces include both hypabyssal and surficial manifestations of voluminous mafic magmatism within the same temporal period. For instance, in most Archaean cratons, greenstone belts correlate with voluminous dike injections as well as usually some form of larger intrusive episodes into the crust. This is particularly true of a series of ultramafic-mafic layered intrusions in the Yilgarn craton of ~2.8 Ga and associated komatiite volcanism and widespread tholeiitic volcanism.

Plume magmatism is an effective mechanism for explaining the large volumes of magmatism required to inflate an intrusion to several kilometres thickness (up to and greater than 13 km or 43,000 ft). Plumes also tend to create warping of the crust, weaken it thermally so that it is easier to intrude magma and create space to host the intrusions.

Geochemical evidence supports the hypothesis that some intrusions result from plume magmatism. In particular, the Noril'sk-Talnakh intrusions are considered to be created by plume magmatism, and other large intrusions have been suggested as created by mantle plumes. However, the story is not so simple, because most ultramafic-mafic layered intrusions also correlate with craton margins, perhaps because they are exhumed more efficiently in cratonic margins because of faulting and subsequent orogeny.

=== Rift magmatism ===
Some large layered complexes are not related to mantle plumes, for example, the Skaergaard intrusion in Greenland. Here, the large magma volumes which are created by mid-ocean ridge spreading allow the accumulation of large volumes of cumulate rocks. The problem of creating space for such intrusions is easily explained by the extensional tectonics in operation; extensional or listric faults operating at depth can provide a triangular space for keel-shaped or boat-shaped intrusions such as the Great Dyke of Zimbabwe, or the Narndee-Windimurra Complex of Western Australia.

It is also possible that what we see as a cratonic margin today were created by the action of a plume event initiating a continental rifting episode; therefore the tectonic setting of most large layered complexes must be carefully weighed in terms of geochemistry and the nature of the host sequence, and in some cases a mixed mechanism cause is possible.

== Causes of layering ==
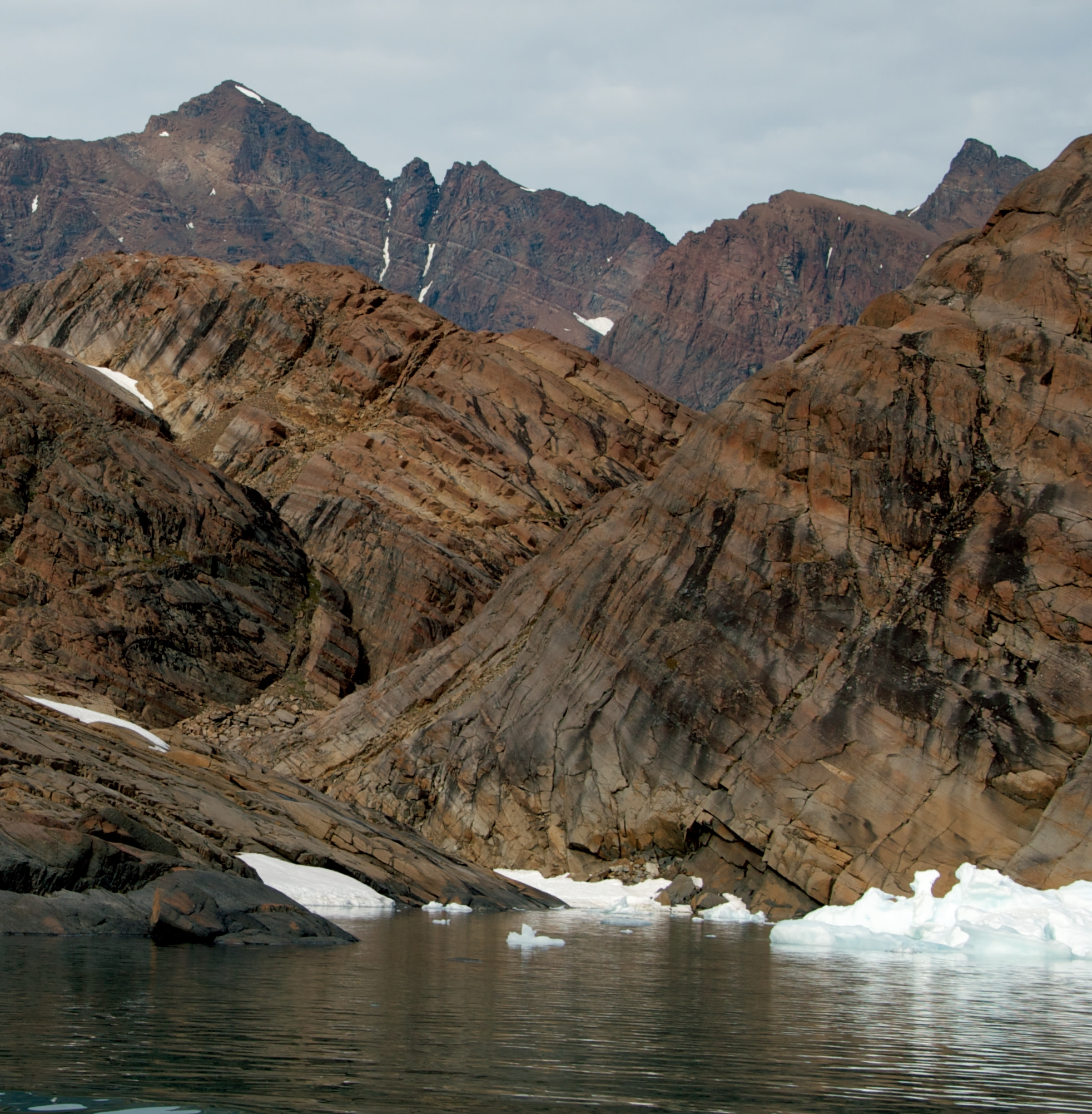
View of the Middle Zone of the Skaergaard layered igneous intrusion, showing the series of plutonic rocks inclined from upper left to lower right

The causes of layering in large ultramafic intrusions are not well understood but leading hypotheses include convection, thermal diffusion, settling of phenocrysts, assimilation of wall rocks and fractional crystallization.

The primary mechanism for forming cumulate layers is thought to be the accumulation of layers of mineral crystals on the floor or roof of the intrusion. Rarely, plagioclase is found in cumulate layers at the top of intrusions, having floated to the top of a much denser magma. Here it can form anorthosite layers.

Accumulation occurs as crystals are formed by fractional crystallisation and, if they are dense enough, precipitate out from the magma. In large, hot magma chambers having vigorous convection and settling, pseudo-sedimentary structures such as flow banding, graded bedding, scour channels, and foreset beds, can be created. The Skaergaard intrusion in Greenland is a prime example of these quasi-sedimentary structures.

Whilst the dominant process of layering is fractional crystallisation, layering can also result in a magma body through assimilation of the wall rocks. This will tend to increase the silica content of the melt, which will eventually prompt a mineral to reach the liquidus for that magma composition. Assimilation of wall rocks takes considerable thermal energy, so this process goes hand in hand with the natural cooling of the magma body. Often, assimilation can only be proven by detailed geochemistry.

Often, cumulate layers are polymineralic, forming gabbro, norite and other rock types. The terminology of cumulate rocks, however, is usually used to describe the individual layers as, for instance, pyroxene-plagioclase cumulates.

Monomineralic cumulate layers are common. These may be economically important, for instance magnetite and ilmenite layers are known to form titanium, vanadium deposits such as at Windimurra intrusion and hard-rock iron deposits (such as at Savage River, Tasmania). Chromite layers are associated with platinum-palladium group element (PGE) deposits, the most famous of these being the Merensky Reef in the Bushveld Igneous Complex.

The central section or upper sections of many large ultramafic intrusions are poorly layered, massive gabbro. This is because as the magma differentiates it reaches a composition favouring crystallisation of only two or three minerals; the magma may also have cooled by this stage sufficiently for the increasing viscosity of the magma to halt effective convection, or convection may stop or break up into inefficient small cells because the reservoir becomes too thin and flat.

Crystal accumulation and layering can expel interstitial melt that migrates through the cumulate pile, reacting with it.

== Economic mineral occurrences ==
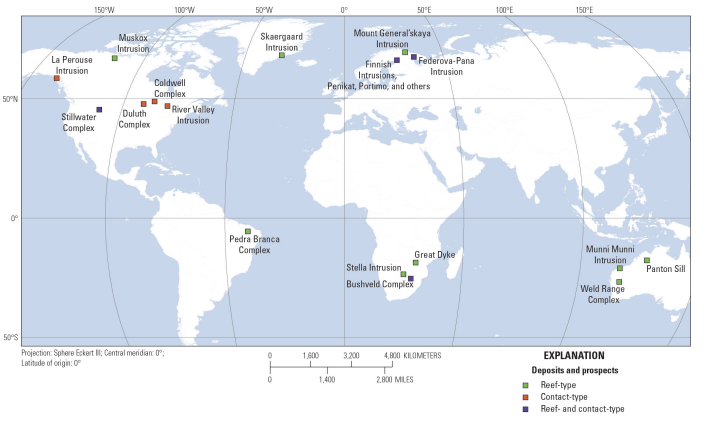
Map displaying the locations of intrusions hosting reef-type PGE and contact-type NI-Cu-PGE deposits. Image courtesy of the U.S. Geological Survey.

Layered intrusions have potential to be economically significant for the occurrence of nickel-copper-platinum group element (Ni-Cu-PGE), chromitite, and ilmenite (Fe-Ti oxide) ore deposits.

=== Common mineral assemblage ===
Economic Ni-Cu-PGE minerals occur in mafic-ultramafic rock within igneous rock-hosted magmatic sulfides emplaced near or at the bottom of the intrusions, in regard to the original orientation of the intrusive complex. The standard magmatic sulfide assemblage is composed of pyrrhotite, pentlandite, and chalcopyrite, with lesser to trace amounts of pyrite, cubanite and magnetite. The respective minerals that make up the copper and nickel ores are chalcopyrite and pentlandite. The platinum group elements are associated with the typical magmatic sulfide assemblage, these platinum group minerals (PGM) occur as sulfides, arsenides, alloys, and native metals.

In chromium-rich layered intrusions, the chromium bearing mineral chromitite can form discrete monomineralic cumulate layers. In local portions of the intrusive suite or in systems lacking chromium, it may occur as chromitite clasts associated with base metal magmatic sulfides. Similar to chromium occurrences, iron and titanium-rich systems may form discrete cumulate layers composed primarily of magnetite and ilmenite. The Bushveld igneous complex, South Africa is an example of a system displaying both of these structures.

=== Foot-wall deposits ===
Ni-Cu-PGE ores in the country rock may be spatially associated with layered complexes, the nickel, copper, and PGMs occur in sulfide veins in the foot-wall of the layered complex. Whether or not there is a direct relationship between igneous and country rock-hosted magmatic sulfides is still debated.

== Examples ==
- Bushveld igneous complex, South Africa
- Dufek intrusion, Antarctica
- Duluth Complex, northeastern Minnesota, United States
- Giles complex intrusions, central Australia
- Great Dyke, Zimbabwe
- Kanichee layered intrusive complex, Ontario, Canada
- Kiglapait intrusion, Labrador, Canada
- Lac des Îles igneous complex, Ontario, Canada
- Muskox intrusion, Northwest Territories, Canada
- Rum intrusion, Scotland
- Skaergaard intrusion of east Greenland
- Stillwater igneous complex, southwestern Montana, United States
- Trompsburg complex, South Africa
- Windimurra intrusion, Western Australia
- Chimalpahad layered complex, Khammam, Telangana, India

== See also ==
- List of rock types
- Igneous differentiation
