= 2014 South African platinum strike =

Workers strike

On 15 November 2014 workers at South Africa's major platinum producers – Anglo American Platinum, Impala Platinum, and Lonmin – went on strike demanding that wages be immediately doubled. However, after five months of striking they settled for a more modest pay increase spread over three years. It was the longest and most expensive strike in South African history.

== Background ==
South Africa is home to 80% of the world's known platinum reserves, and produces about 70% of the world's supply. Platinum prices have been flat since 2009 or so, due to weak demand for catalytic converters, the primary use of platinum in industry. Meanwhile, other costs have risen, putting pressure on the mining industry. In 2013, roughly half of South Africa mining shafts operated at a net loss.

The market is controlled primarily by three companies - Anglo American Platinum (Amplats), Impala Platinum (Implats), and Lonmin. Amplats is the world's largest producer of platinum. Workers are mostly represented by either the Association of Mineworkers and Construction Union (AMCU) or the National Union of Mineworkers (NUM). Potential layoffs are a particularly sensitive issue in South Africa, as 25% of the country is unemployed.

== Strike ==
On January 23, 2014, nearly 70,000 AMCU platinum workers in the Rustenburg area went on strike. The strike affected all three of South Africa's major platinum producers, with Lonmin hardest hit. Mines which would otherwise produce around 40% of the world's platinum had seized operating.

AMCU demanded that minimum wage be increased from 5,000 rand ($US480) to 12,500 rand ($1,200) a month. The platinum companies called the demand unrealistic and for most of the strike refused to go beyond a 10% wage increase. One estimate suggested platinum would have to hit $2,405 an ounce for the industry to break even if the workers demands were met; platinum sold for roughly $1,430 an ounce when the strike started. By June, AMCU was arguing for steady wage increases over 4 years to meet the 12,500 rand goal by 2017 instead of immediately.

In May, Ngoako Ramatlhodi was appointed as the new Minister of Mineral Resources. He immediately appointed a task force to try to restart stalled negotiations. On June 7, Ramatlhodi said he would pull out of negotiations if a deal was not reached by the 9th. However, he denied he was "abandoning" negotiations. I strongly believe we've done enough work ... for the parties to be able to move forward [independently]," he said.

On June 12, a preliminary agreement was reached when the mining companies offered a 1,000 rand per month pay increase. The offer was quickly endorsed by some workers and AMCU leader Joseph Mathunjwa publicly stated a deal was imminent the following day. However, other workers raised concerns about the length of the agreement, back pay, and living allowances. The union then made additional demands, stalling talks.

On June 18, it was revealed that AMCU was demanding a one-time 3,000 rand payment for every worker to compensate for the strike and that workers fired during the strike be rehired. The union also requested the platinum companies not pursue criminal charges against workers suspected of violence during the strike. In exchange, they promised to avoid future strikes. In a joint statement, the platinum companies said the new demands would cost an additional 1 billion rand and were impossible to meet.

== Deal ==
On June 23, a deal was reached between AMCU and the platinum companies. Under the three-year agreement, workers who currently make less than 12,500 rand will receive a 1,000-rand raise this year and in 2015. In 2016, they will receive a 950-rand raise. After the wage increases, the minimum salary will be 8,000 rand ($750) a month. The mining companies did not agree to avoid future job cuts as they sought to operate more efficiently.

After the deal was announced, there were large celebrations throughout Rustenburg. In the mining town of Marikana, people wearing AMCU T-shirts flooded the streets. Mathunjwa called the deal "a breakthrough [where] we have managed to unshackle ourselves from this structure that came long from colonization to the national party".

The deal was signed on June 24, and workers began to return to work on June 25. It was expected that a return to full production would take three months. AMCU said it would continue to work to increase the minimum wage to 12,500 rand by 2017. By the time a deal was reached, the strike had become the longest and most expensive in South Africa history.

== Impact ==
The strike cost the platinum industry around 1.2 million ounces of production, worth about 24 billion rand ($2.25 billion). Amplats estimated it had lost 11 billion rand ($1.04 billion) in revenue. The company spent about 2.4 billion rand on overhead on mines closed during the strike. Additional losses were expected while the companies paid full wages, but experienced less than full production while production ramped back up. Impant executive commented "This strike has been enormously damaging. It has destroyed the relationships we have with employees, communities, the union and government ... It has resulted in us taking an untold financial impact. ... it could substantially influence the shape of the future business." Amplats said it would consider selling its AMCU mines as it moved its core business to mechanized production, such as the Mogalakwena mine.

As a result of the strike, Lonmin stock fell 21% and Implats stock fell 11%. However, Amplats stock rose 9% during the strike. Stock analyst Edward Sterck of BMO Capital Markets said the market had likely underestimated the damage done to the industry by the strike. Global platinum prices rose 6% during the strike, but prices retreated in early-June when a deal looked imminent. The price of palladium, which is closely tied to that of platinum, rose 15%. The modest increase in the price of platinum was due to a large stockpile of global platinum reserves built up over several years of weak demand. When talks stalled in mid-June, the price of the precious metals again rose.

A number of companies not directly affected by the strike were also hard hit. Mining supply companies lost money and in some cases laid off workers or went bankrupt as a result. Rustenburg shop owners saw revenue drop, leading to some closures and many missed rent payments. The GDP of South Africa contracted in the first quarter of 2014, pulled down by the steepest drop in mining production (25% of which 19% was directly attributable to the strike) in 50 years. It was the first contraction since 2009. Fitch Ratings downgraded its outlook on South Africa to "negative" from "stable". Standard & Poor's also downgraded its outlook, specifically citing the strike as the main reason for the downgrade. The nationwide impact of the strike led to calls for laws to give the government or court system "strike-breaking" powers.

The human toll of the strike was also substantial. Three workers and a spouse were killed. Six were stabbed on their way back to work. The workers, most of whom already lived in poverty, lost around 11 billion rand ($1 billion) in wages. One worker described the strike: "that five months was tough, tough, tough, tough" saying he depended on family and charity for food. The disaster relief charity Gift of the Givers had spent 3.4 million rand on food parcels and medical care for the strikers by early June. The strike also caused a substantial increase in the number of stray animals in Rustenburg as people abandoned pets they could no longer afford to feed.

== Analysis ==
Commentary published in The Guardian called the strike "the political story of the last year or so" and suggested it would be considered a moment "that really brought long-term change to the South African political system" twenty years from now. It called the strike the most significant non-African National Congress action to help black people since the fall of apartheid. "This is a very real demonstration of political power by an organization that is black, and not a part of the ANC," the commentary continued. "In fact it is opposed to the ANC and its allies".

Industry analysts cautioned that further difficulty was likely as the platinum companies would need to cut the work force to regain profitability. Commentary published in Business Day said further conflict was likely and said "It is difficult to find a silver lining". To avoid serious problems, the paper argued, efforts were needed from both the mining industry and the government. It argued that the industry should take a more active role in managing the socio-economic issues affecting its workforces, but said the government needed to use tax money to help as well. Furthermore, it argued that laws regarding government intervention powers, migrant workers, and union rules needed to be revised.

During the AMCU strike, rival union NUM representatives sharpened their rhetoric, suggesting the possibility of another costly strike in the near future. On July 1, the about two-thirds of the 340,000 member union went on strike, seeking a 12% pay raise.
