= Merensky Reef =

Layer of igneous rock in the Bushveld igneous complex, South Africa

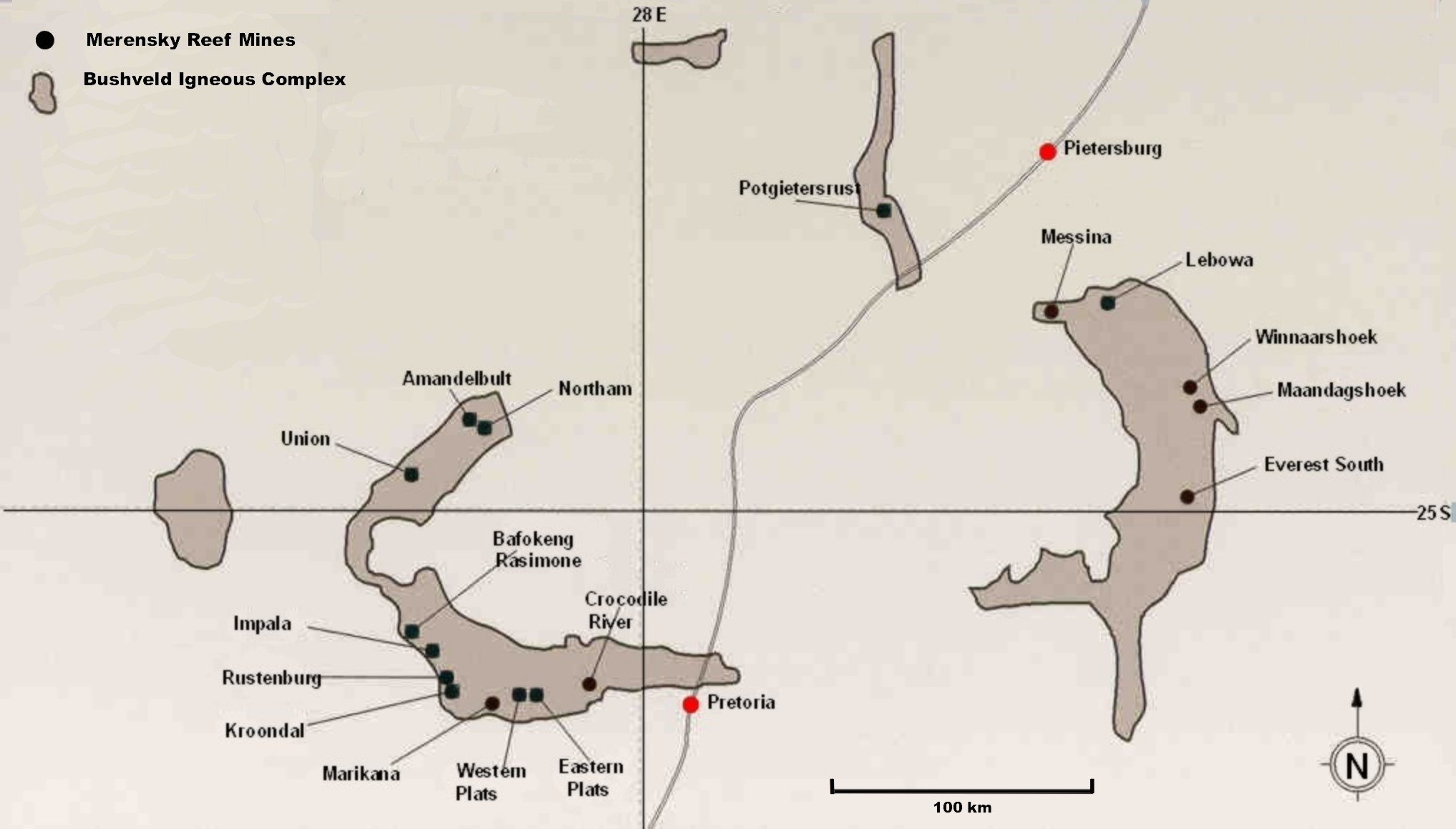
Mines of the Merensky Reef

The Merensky Reef is a layer of igneous rock in the Bushveld Igneous Complex (BIC) in the North West, Limpopo, Gauteng and Mpumalanga provinces of South Africa which together with an underlying layer, the Upper Group 2 Reef (UG2), contains most of the world's known reserves of platinum group metals (PGMs) or platinum group elements (PGEs)—platinum, palladium, rhodium, ruthenium, iridium and osmium. The Reef is 46 cm thick and bounded by thin chromite seams or stringers. The composition consists predominantly of cumulate rocks, including leuconorite, anorthosite, chromitite, and melanorite.

== Composition ==
The UG2 Reef, the composition of which is relatively consistent throughout the BIC, is rich in chromite. However, the UG2 Reef lacks the Merensky's gold, copper and nickel by-products, though its reserves may be almost twice those of the Merensky Reef. Overall, the Merensky Reef is observed to be a lower layer composed of anorthosite or norite with a thin layer of chromitite over top. In addition, there is commonly a layer overlying both composed of feldspathic pyroxenite. Chromitite layers occur commonly in large mafic layered intrusions. A current theory suggests chromitites form as a result of introduction and mixing of chemically primitive magma with a more evolved magma, which results in supersaturation of chromite in the mixture and the formation of a nearly monomineralic layer on the magma chamber floor. The leading theory regarding the formation of the Merensky reef is that of crystals originating from a main magma source accumulated and cooled as the magma rose resulting in crystallization. Yet the nature of crystallization is complex.

== Layers ==
The Merensky Reef is composed of five different layers. The first layer is mottled anorthosite which is pyroxene oikocrysts and is described as dark colored bands. The mottled anorthosite is composed of traces of quartz, titanite and apatite minerals. The second layer is Merensky chromitites which are highly irregular grains of basal chromitite. The third layer is similar to the second layer with Merensky chromitites, however the basal chromitite is compact and smaller in size. The fourth layer is Merensky pegmatite and is composed of coarse-grained silicate with an approximate thickness of 2.6 cm thick. In the fourth layer, chromite is sparse and sulfides are present. The fifth layer is Merensky melanorite and is a fine-grained chalcopyrite, quartz and feldspar rich matrix.

== Whole-rock chemistry ==
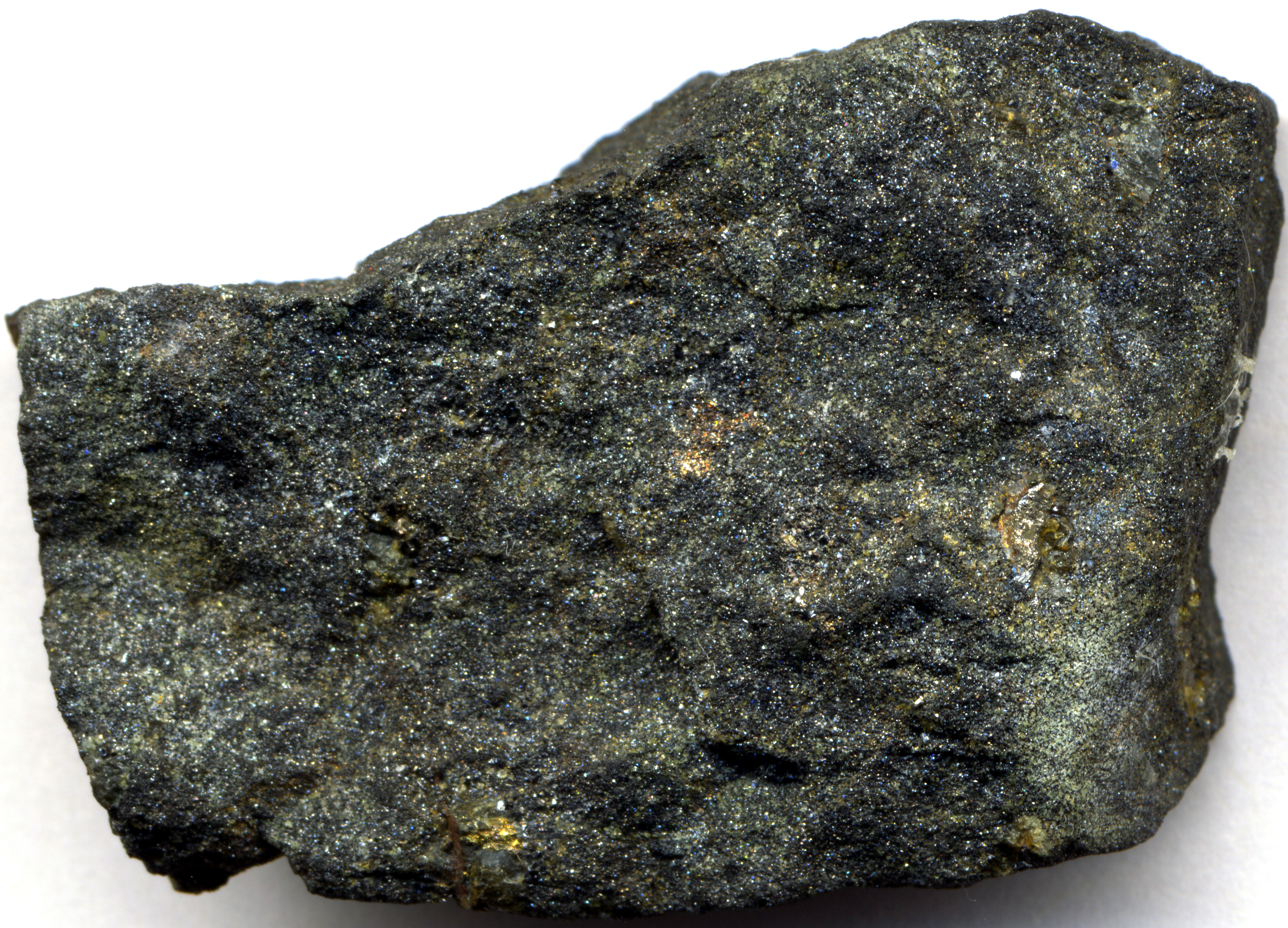
Sulfidic chromitite from Merensky Reef (sample size: 45 mm)

The Merensky Reef has a high concentration of chromitites. However, the chromitites differ from one another in their levels of iridium, ruthenium, rhodium and platinum present. There is reported trace element enrichment shown by arsenic, cadmium, tin and tellurium. The Merensky Reef is similar to the Platreef because of the presence of primitive mantle, layered intrusions and levels of nickel and copper. The Merensky-type reef has been separated into two categories, the orthomagmatic and the hydromagmatic. The orthomagmatic group is composed of platinum group element mineralization. The hydromagmatic group is composed of platinum group element mineralization to volatile-rich fluids separating from a solid cumulate pile.

== Crystallization ==
There are several theories that suggest how the crystallization on the Merensky Reef occurred. The first accepted hypothesis of the Merensky Reef suggests the chromite crystallization originated from hybrid melts and significant lateral mixing of new and resident magma. In detail, the first hypothesis suggests the high of PGE concentrations were a result from the sulfide and silicate melt. The sulfide melt plays an important role in this hypothesis because the sulfide melt is dense and the settling of the melt through the magma column to the floor of the chamber allowed such mixing to occur. One theory suggests the chromite crystallization originated from hybrid melts and lateral mixing. Another theory that suggests the crystallization originated from chromite and sulfide droplets. However, there is also another theory that the crystallization originated from emplaced magma merging with roof-rock melts. In the theory of roof-rock melts, there was contamination between the new magma and silica-rich resident melt. The contamination resulted in chromite and PGM crystallization because the chromite grains attracted the PGM crystals. After crystallization, the crystals were carried in the collapsing margins and formed the layers of chromitite and PGE.

== History ==
The Bushveld Complex chromitites were first reported by Hall and Humphrey in 1908. The initial recovery of platinum in South Africa took place on several of the large East Rand gold mines and the first separate platinum mine was a short lived venture near Naboomspruit that worked very patchy quartz reefs. The discovery of the Bushveld Igneous Complex deposits was made in 1924 by a Lydenburg district farmer, A F Lombaard. It was recorded to be approximately 80 kilometers in length. This was an alluvial deposit but its importance was recognized by Hans Merensky whose prospecting work discovered the primary source in the Bushveld Igneous Complex and traced it for several hundred kilometres by 1930. Extensive mining of the Reef didn't take place until an upsurge in the demand for platinum group metals used in exhaust pollution control in the 1950s, made exploitation economically feasible. Extraction of metals from the UG2 chromitite could only take place in the 1970s with major advances in metallurgy. The first mine which successfully concentrated on the extraction of chrome-rich UG2 Chromitite Layer was the Western Platinum Mine.
