= Bafokeng mine =

Platinum ine in Rustenburg, North West, South Africa

- Location within South Africa

Location
- Location: Rustenburg, North West, South Africa; 25°27′54.36″S 27°5′59.64″E

Production
- Products: platinum, palladium, rhodium, ruthenium, gold

Owner
- Company: Anglo American Platinum

The Bafokeng mine is a large open pit mine located in the north-eastern part of South Africa in Rustenburg, North West. Bafokeng represents one of the largest platinum reserves in South Africa having estimated reserves of 47.9 million oz of platinum. The mine produces around 171,000 oz of platinum/year.
