= Transvaal Basin =

Geological basin of the Kaapvaal craton

Geography of Transvaal Basin
- Continent: Africa
- Region: Eswatini, South Africa
- Coordinates: 25°09′28″S 26°44′11″E
- Borders: Mozambique, Botswana, Zimbabwe

The Transvaal Basin is one of three basins of the Transvaal Supergroup on the Kaapvaal craton. The evolution of this 2.65–2.05 Ga Neoarchaean–Palaeoproterozoic basin is thought to have been derived largely from magmatism, palaeoclimate and eustasy, while plate tectonics played an intermittent role. The supergroup is made up of basal ‘protobasinal’ rocks, upon which followed the Black Reef Formation, Chuniespoort Group and the uppermost Pretoria Group.

The Transvaal Supergroup displays three unconformity-bounded sequences that surface in two geographically distinct areas – the Transvaal Basin, which circumscribes the Bushveld Igneous Complex, and the Griqualand West basin, lying between Kimberley and Sishen at the western Kaapvaal craton rim, extending into southern Botswana beneath the Kalahari Sands as the Kanye Basin. The two basins are separated by the broad Vryburg Arch.

Between approximately 2.640 and 2.516 Ga, two successive stromatolitic carbonate platforms developed in the basin of the Kaapvaal craton. Oldest was the Schmidtsdrif Subgroup, deposited in the southwestern part of the basin, showing stromatolitic carbonates, siliciclastic sediments and small lava flows. This was followed by the Nauga formation carbonates deposited on peritidal flats in the southwest, which were inundated during a marine transgression of the Transvaal Supergroup continental sea, at some 2.550 Ga. This resulted in a carbonate platform in the Transvaal and Griqualand West Basins, lasting for 30–50 Ma. Shales were deposited during this period over the Nauga Formation carbonates. Following this a subsidence led to immersion of the stromatolitic platform and to sediments of iron-rich banded iron formations being laid down over the entire basin.
