= Modikwa mine =

Platinum mine in Burgersfort, Limpopo, South Africa

Modikwa platinum mine
- Location: Burgersfort, Limpopo, South Africa
- Products: platinum, palladium, rhodium, ruthenium, gold
- Company: African Rainbow Minerals and Anglo American Platinum (Joint Venture)

The Modikwa platinum mine is a large underground mine in the north-eastern part of South Africa northwest of Burgersfort, Limpopo. It is part of the Bushveld Igneous Complex. Modikwa represents one of the largest platinum reserves in South Africa having estimated reserves of 215.2 million tonnes of ore grading 2 g/t platinum, 1.87 g/t palladium and minor grades of gold, rhodium, ruthenium and iridium. The mine has reserves of 13.8 million oz of platinum and 12.9 million oz of palladium and produces around 120,000 oz of platinum/year and 110,000 oz of palladium/year. The mine is owned under a 50%/50% joint venture by African Rainbow Minerals and Anglo American Platinum. Each of these companies have part of their stakes subdivided between other companies.
