= Twickenham mine =

Platinum mine in Mokopane (Waterberg District Municipality), Limpopo, South Africa

- Location: Mokopane (Waterberg District Municipality), Limpopo, South Africa
- Products: platinum, palladium, rhodium, ruthenium, gold
- Company: Anglo American Platinum

The Twickenham mine is a large open pit mine located in the north-western part of South Africa in Mokopane, Limpopo. Twickenham represents one of the largest platinum reserves in South Africa having estimated reserves of 39.6 million oz of platinum. The mine produces around 45,000 oz of platinum/year.
