= Mototolo mine =

Platinum mine in Limpopo, South Africa

- Location in South Africa
- Location: Burgersfort, Limpopo, South Africa; 24°59′07″S 30°06′28″E
- Products: platinum, palladium, rhodium, ruthenium, gold
- Company: Anglo American Platinum

The Mototolo mine is a large platinum mine located in the north-eastern part of South Africa in Burgersfort, Limpopo. Mototolo represents one of the largest platinum reserves in South Africa, having estimated reserves of 5.5 million oz of platinum. The mine produces around 57,000 oz of platinum per year.
