= Kroondal mine =

Open pit platinum mine in South Africa

- Location within South Africa
- Location: Rustenburg, North West, South Africa; 25°42′42.01″S 27°21′20.02″E
- Products: platinum, palladium, rhodium, ruthenium, gold
- Company: Anglo American Platinum

The Kroondal mine is a large open pit mine located in the north-western part of South Africa in Rustenburg, North West. Kroondal represents one of the largest platinum reserves in South Africa having estimated reserves of 6.2 million oz of platinum. The mine produces around 217,000 oz of platinum/year.
