= Bokoni mine =

Platinum mine in Polokwane, Limpopo, South Africa

Location
- Location: Polokwane, Limpopo, South Africa

Production
- Products: platinum, palladium, rhodium, ruthenium, gold
- Production: 55,000 troy ounces (1,700 kg) (2012)

Owner
- Company: African Rainbow Minerals

The Bokoni mine is a large open pit mine located in the north-eastern part of South Africa in Polokwane, Limpopo. Bokoni represents one of the largest platinum reserves in South Africa having estimated reserves of 75.7 million troy ounces (2,350 t) of platinum. The mine produces around 55,000 troy ounces (1,700 kg) of platinum/year.
