= Transvaal Supergroup =

Stratigraphic unit in northern South Africa and southern Botswana

Geography of Transvaal Supergroup
- Continent: Africa
- Region: Botswana, South Africa
- Coordinates: 25°05′55″S 26°12′36″E
- Borders: Mozambique

The Transvaal Supergroup is a stratigraphic unit in northern South Africa and southern Botswana, situated on the Kaapvaal craton, roughly between 23 and 29 degrees southern latitude and 22 to 30 degrees eastern longitude. It is dated to the boundary between the Archean and Proterozoic eras, roughly 2,500 Mya. It is delimited by the Witwatersrand Basin (2,700 Mya) and the Bushveld Igneous Complex (2,050 Mya).

It consists of three parts,

- the Transvaal Basin in the east
- the Griqualand Basin in the west
- the smaller Kanye Basin in southern Botswana.

Transvaal sedimentation began with predominantly clastic sedimentary rocks (Black Reef-Vryburg Formations) followed by carbonate rocks and banded iron formations (Chuniespoort-Ghaap-Taupone Groups). After an erosional hiatus, the clastic sedimentary rocks and volcanics of the Pretoria-Postmasburg-Segwagwa Groups were deposited within the three basins, largely under closed-basin conditions. A final stage of predominantly volcanic succession (Rooiberg Group-Loskop Formation) is limited to the Transvaal Basin.

The Campbellrand-Malmani carbonate platform is part of the Chuniespoort Group and originally covered all of the Kaapvaal craton. It has a thickness of over 1 km in both the Malmani and Campbellrand Subgroups. The Malmani Subgroup is situated northwest of Johannesburg. It consists of dolomite and chert with only minor clastic sediments.

Several workers such as an environmentalist, Isaac Chuene, Raymond Ngobeni and Khutso Masemola noted the presence of fossils in the Chunniespoort mountains of the Chunniespoort Group.

== See also ==
- Geology of South Africa
