= Platinum chloride =

Platinum chloride may refer to the following:

- Platinum(II) chloride
- Platinum(IV) chloride
