= Mogalakwena mine =

Platinum mine in Mokopane, Limpopo, South Africa

- Location: Mokopane, Limpopo, South Africa
- Products: platinum, palladium, rhodium, ruthenium, gold
- Company: Anglo American Platinum

The Mogalakwena mine is a large open pit mine located in the north-western part of South Africa in Mokopane, Limpopo. Mogalakwena represents one of the largest platinum reserves in South Africa having estimated reserves of 264.9 million oz of platinum. The mine produces around 310,000 oz of platinum/year.

The mine is majority owned by Anglo American, and has been the subject of conflict between the company and the local Mapela and Langa communities. In 2007, over 100 local people filed legal proceedings against a subsidiary of Anglo, alleging that the company had forcibly relocated communities, coerced people into signing agreements, and then failed to honor those agreements. The case was unsuccessful.

In 2008 the South African Human Rights Commission investigated the impact of Anglo's mining activity at Moglakwena and reported that the company had failed to give local communities access to water, sanitation and electricity after relocating them. The Commission reported that local communities had also been impacted by air and water pollution from the mine, loss of food and agricultural security, and the removal of graves; and that Anglo had failed to respond when the community raised concerns.

In 2021, the mine began a project of using solar panels to power a 3.5 MW hydrogen electrolyser to supply an 800 kW mining truck.
