= Pyroxenite =

Pyroxene dominated ultramafic igneous rock

- Igneous rock
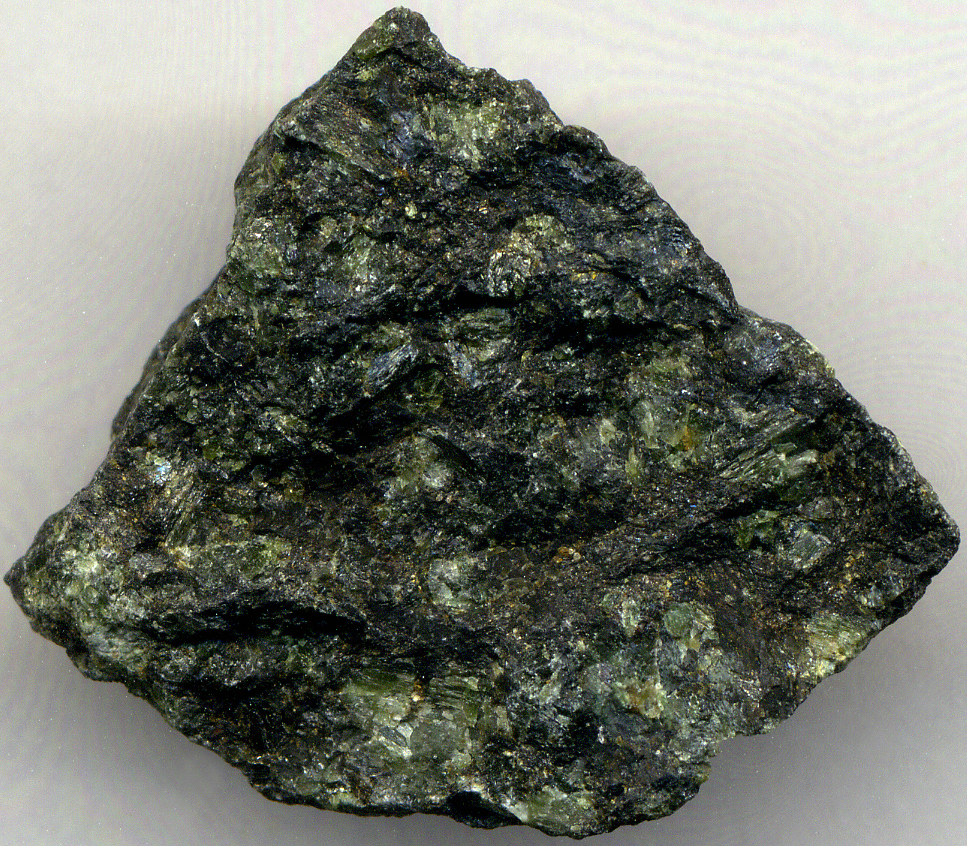
- Neoarchean pyroxenite from the Stillwater complex, Montana.

Composition
- Classification: Ultramafic
- Primary: Pyroxene (orthopyroxene and/or clinopyroxene)
- Secondary: olivine, hornblende, garnet, spinel, chromite, anorthite
- Texture: Phaneritic

Pyroxenite is an ultramafic igneous rock consisting essentially of minerals of the pyroxene group, such as augite, diopside, hypersthene, bronzite or enstatite. Pyroxenes have the general formula XY(Si,Al)_{2}O_{6}, where X represents ions of calcium (Ca), sodium (Na), iron (Fe(II)) or magnesium (Mg) and more rarely zinc, manganese or lithium, and Y represents ions of smaller size, such as chromium (Cr), aluminium (Al), magnesium (Mg), cobalt (Co), manganese (Mn), scandium (Sc), titanium (Ti), vanadium (V) or even iron (Fe(II) or Fe(III)). Pyroxenes share a common structure consisting of single chains of silica tetrahedra; those that crystallize in the monoclinic system are known as clinopyroxenes and those that crystallize in the orthorhombic system are known as orthopyroxenes. Accordingly, pyroxenites are classified into clinopyroxenites and orthopyroxenites. The websterites contain both types of pyroxenes (see diagram below). Closely allied to this group are the hornblendites, consisting essentially of hornblende and other amphiboles.

Most pyroxenites are derived from upper mantle, either as solid blocks and fragments, or more commonly as crystals accumulated from magmas that formed in the mantle. They commonly occur alongside peridotites. Pyroxenites are essentially of igneous origin, though some pyroxenites are included in the metamorphic Lewisian complex of Scotland where the pyroxene-rich rocks result from the type of contact metamorphism known as pyroxene-hornfels facies, have siliceous sediment or basaltic protoliths, and are respectively metapelites and metabasites.

== Crust and mantle ==
=== Crustal intrusions ===
Intrusive pyroxenites are closely allied to gabbros and norites, from which they differ by the absence of feldspar, and to peridotites, which are distinguished from them by containing more than 40% olivine. This connection is indicated also by their mode of occurrence, for they usually accompany masses of gabbro and peridotite and seldom are found by themselves.

Pyroxenites are often very coarse-grained, containing individual crystals which may be several centimeters in length. The principal accessory minerals, in addition to olivine and feldspar, are chromite and other spinels, garnet, magnetite, rutile, and scapolite.

Pyroxenites can be formed as cumulates in ultramafic intrusions by accumulation of pyroxene crystals at the base of the magma chamber. Here they are generally associated with gabbro and anorthite cumulate layers and are typically high up in the intrusion. They may be accompanied by magnetite layers, ilmenite layers, but rarely chromite cumulates.

=== Upper mantle ===
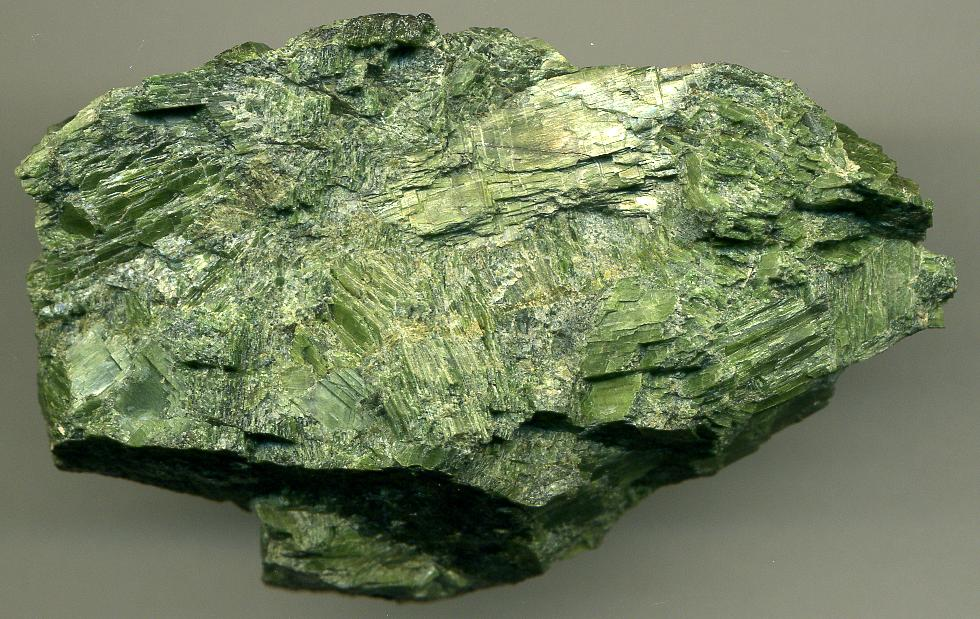
Metamorphosed (serpentinized) clinopyroxenite, made of green diopside, from the Shetland ophiolite, Unst, Scotland

Pyroxenites are also commonly found as layers within masses of peridotite. These layers most commonly have been interpreted as products of reaction between ascending magmas and peridotite of the upper mantle. The layers typically are a few centimeters to a meter or so in thickness. They can also form from magma cumulates in the upper mantle. Pyroxenites that occur as xenoliths in basalt and in kimberlite have been interpreted as fragments of such layers. Although some mantle pyroxenites contain garnet, they are not eclogites, as clinopyroxene in them is less sodic than omphacite and the pyroxenite compositions typically are unlike that of basalt. Pyroxenites might play an important role in basalt genesis (e.g., Lambart et al., 2016), either by contributing directly to the magma production, or indirectly as the result of reaction between peridotite and magma derived from partial melting of eclogite (e.g., Sobolev and others, 2007).

== Volcanic rocks ==
Purely pyroxene-bearing volcanic rocks are rare, restricted to spinifex-textured sills, lava tubes and thick lava flows in the Archaean greenstone belts. Here, the pyroxenite lavas are created by in-situ crystallisation and accumulation of pyroxene at the base of a lava flow, creating the distinctive spinifex texture, but also occasionally mesocumulate and orthocumulate segregations. This is in essence similar to the formation of olivine spinifex textures in komatiite lava flows, the chemistry of the magma differing only to favor crystallisation of pyroxene.

Type localities include the Gullewa Greenstone Belt, in the Murchison region and the Duketon Belt near Laverton, of Western Australia where pyroxene spinifex lavas are closely associated with gold deposits.

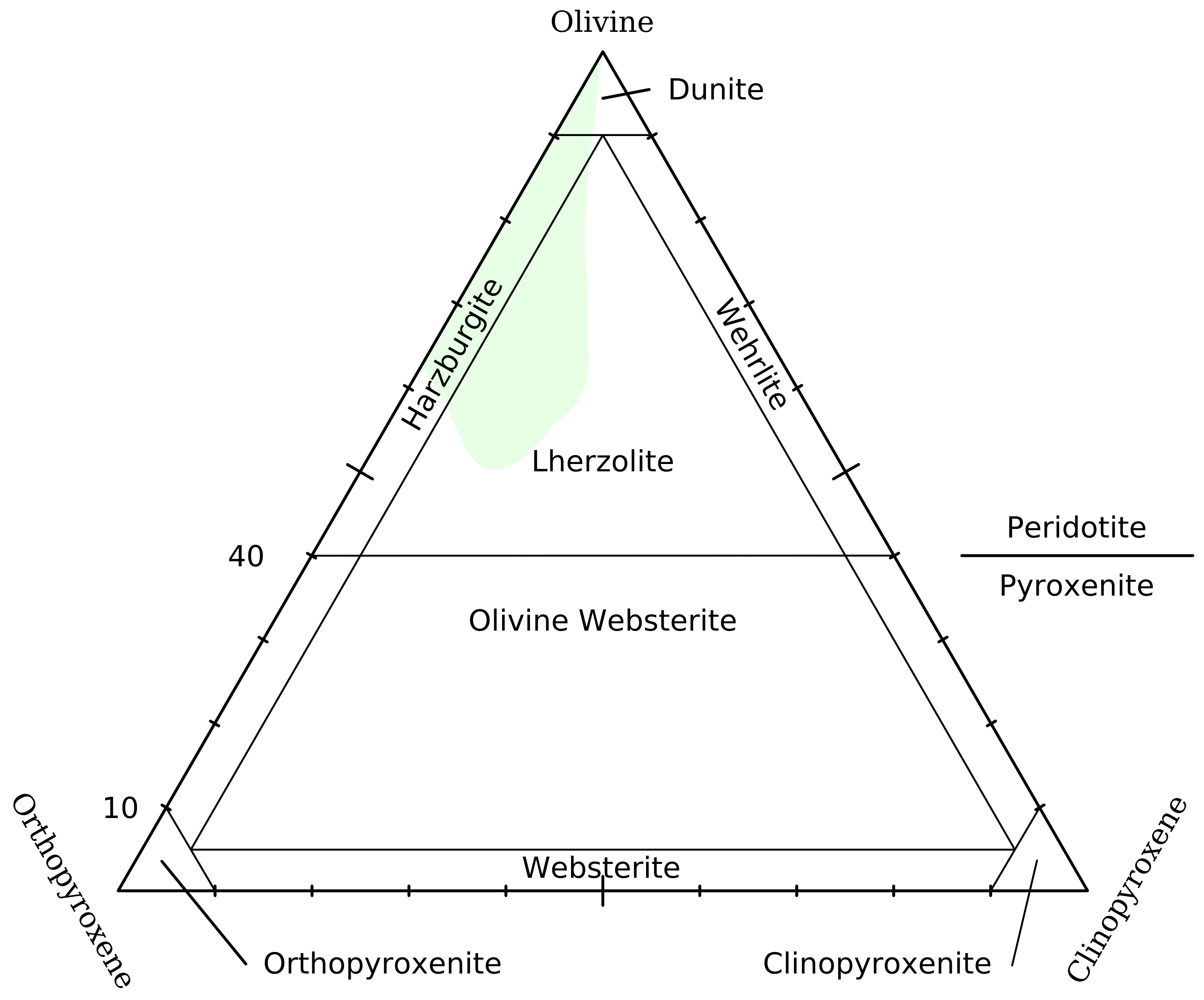
Classification diagram for peridotite and pyroxenite, based on proportions of olivine and pyroxene. The pale green area encompasses the most common compositions of peridotite in the upper part of the Earth's mantle

== Distribution ==
Pyroxenites frequently occur in the form of dikes or segregations in gabbro and peridotite, for example in Shetland, in Cortland on the Hudson River, North Carolina (websterite), in Baltimore, in New Zealand, and in Saxony. They are also found in the Bushveld Igneous Complex in South Africa and The Great Dyke in Zimbabwe.

The pyroxenites are often subject serpentinization under low temperature retrograde metamorphism and weathering. The rocks are often completely replaced by serpentines, which sometimes preserve the original structures of the primary minerals, such as the lamination of hypersthene and the rectangular cleavage of augite. Under pressure-metamorphism hornblende is developed and various types of amphibolite and hornblende-schist are produced. Occasionally rocks rich in pyroxene are found as basic facies of nepheline syenite; a good example is provided by the melanite pyroxenites associated with the borolanite variety found in the Loch Borralan igneous complex of Scotland.
