= Norite =

Mafic intrusive igneous rock

- Igneous rock
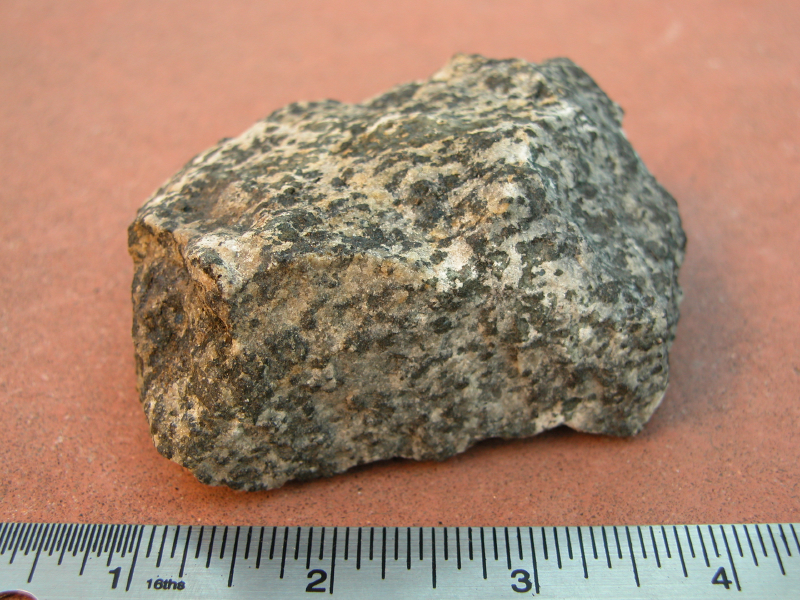
- Sample of norite

Composition
- Classification: Mafic
- Primary: plagioclase, orthopyroxene
- Secondary: olivine, hornblende, biotite
- Texture: Phaneritic

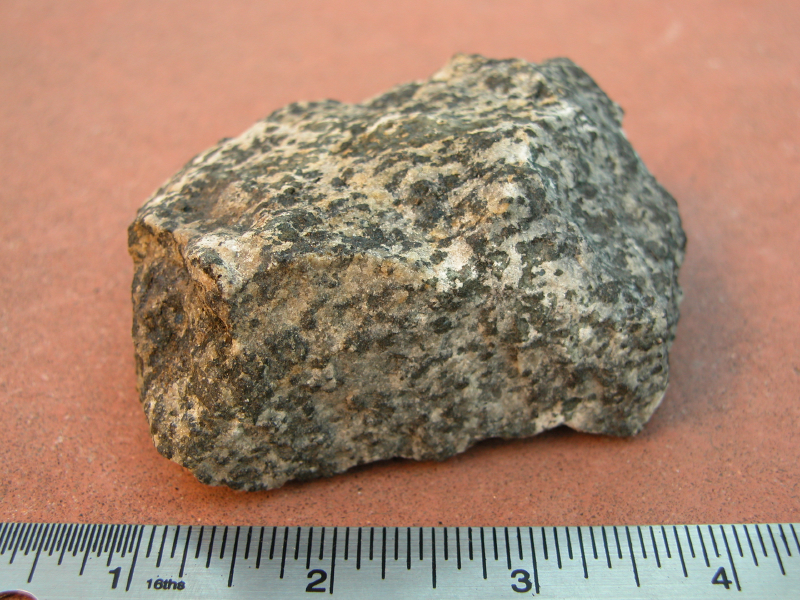
Sample of norite

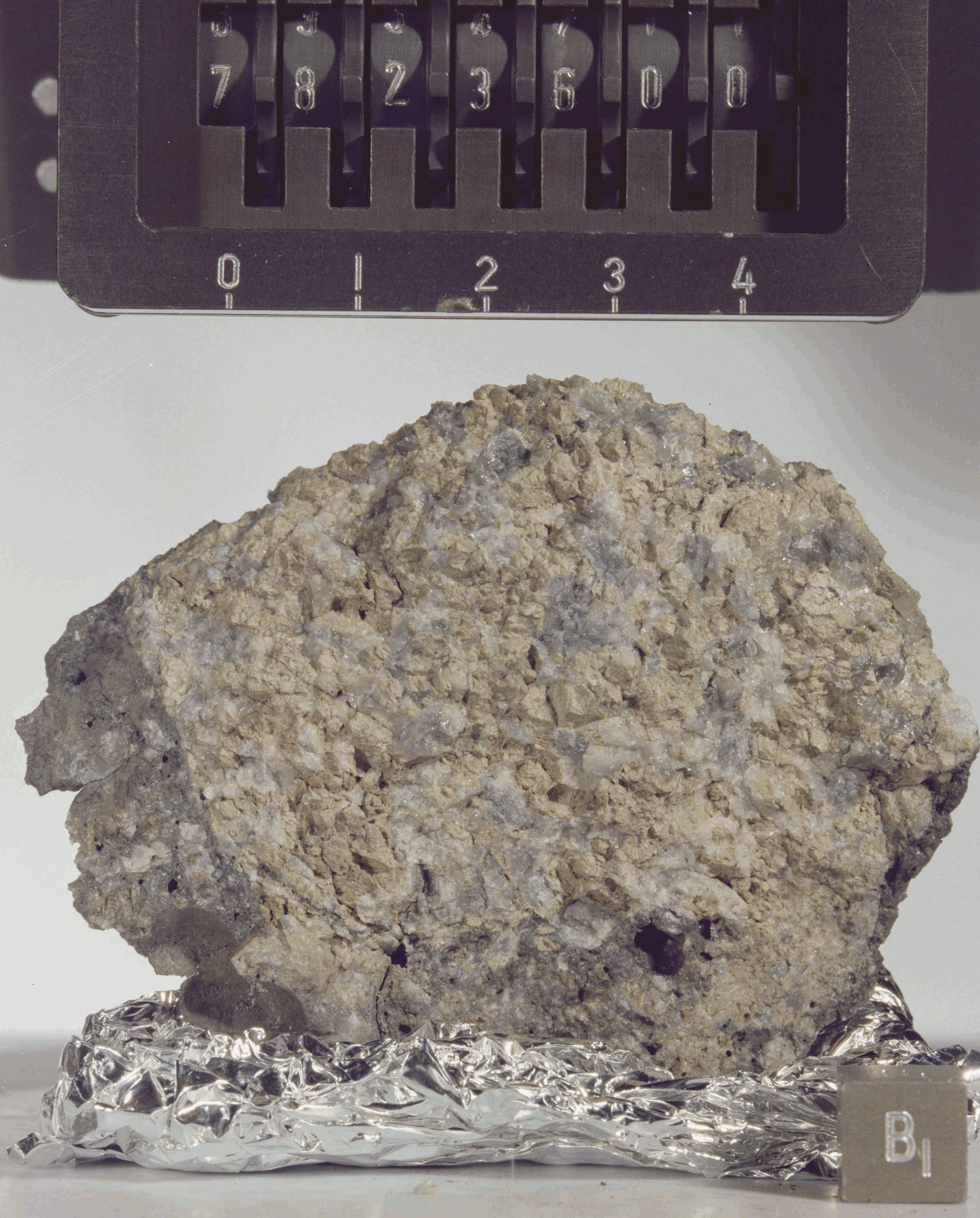
Shocked norite found in the Taurus-Littrow valley on the moon during the Apollo 17 mission (sample 78236).

Norite is a mafic intrusive igneous rock composed largely of the calcium-rich plagioclase labradorite, orthopyroxene, and olivine. The name norite is derived from Norway, by its Norwegian name Norge.

Norite, also known as orthopyroxene gabbro, may be essentially indistinguishable from gabbro without thin section study under the petrographic microscope. The principal difference between norite and gabbro is the type of pyroxene of which it is composed. Norite is predominantly composed of orthopyroxenes, largely high-magnesian enstatite or an iron-bearing hypersthene. The principal pyroxenes in gabbro are clinopyroxenes, generally iron-rich augites.

Norite occurs with gabbro and other mafic to ultramafic rocks in layered intrusions which are often associated with platinum orebodies such as in the Bushveld Igneous Complex in South Africa, the Skaergaard igneous complex of Greenland, and the Stillwater igneous complex in Montana. Norite is also the basal igneous rock of the Sudbury Basin complex in Ontario, which is the site of a comet impact and the world's second-largest nickel mining region.

Norite is a common rock type of the Apollo samples. On a smaller scale, norite can be found in small localized intrusions such as the Gombak norite in Bukit Batok, Singapore. It is also plentiful in the Sokndal intrusion area of southwestern Norway, with titanium deposits to the east.
