= Chromitite =

Rock composed mostly of the mineral chromite

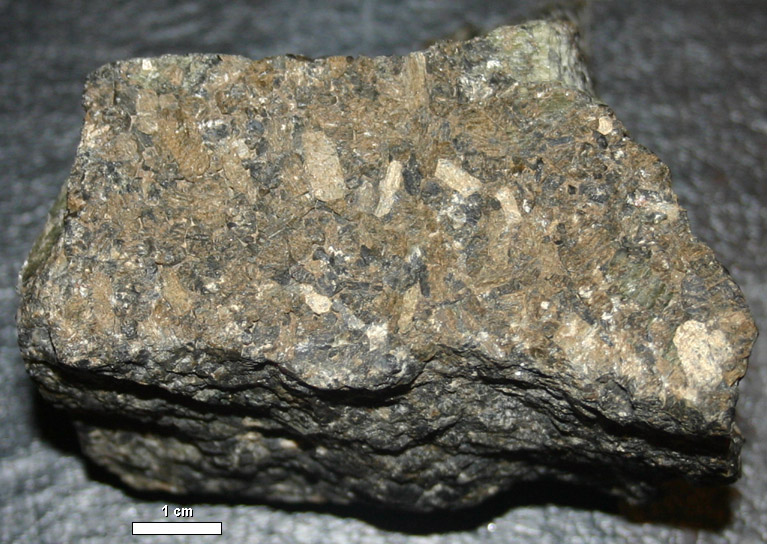
Chromitite with bronzite phenocrysts from Stillwater Igneous Complex

Chromitite is an igneous cumulate rock composed mostly of the mineral chromite. It is found in layered intrusions such as the Bushveld Igneous Complex in South Africa, the Stillwater igneous complex in Montana and the Ring of Fire discovery in Ontario.

Chromitite typically forms as orthocumulate layered lenses in peridotite rocks, at times intergrown with other oxides such as magnetite and ilmenite, and silicates such as olivine, pyroxene, plagioclase feldspar (mainly anorthite), and garnet crystals. The chromium rich garnet uvarovite forms in interbedded layers with chromitite.

Chromitite is the main economic source for the mining of chromite and subsequent source of the metal chromium.
