= Valterra Platinum =

South African mining company

- Company type: Public limited company
- Traded as: LSE: VALT
- ISIN: ZAE000013181
- Industry: Mining
- Founded: 1995; 31 years ago
- Headquarters: Johannesburg, South Africa
- Area served: Worldwide
- Key people: Norman Mbazima (Chairman); Craig Miller (CEO)
- Products: Platinum
- Website: www.valterraplatinum.com

Valterra Platinum Limited (formerly Anglo American Platinum Limited) is a South African mining company, and the world's largest primary producer of platinum; accounting for about 38% of the world's annual supply. It was demerged from Anglo American on 31 May 2025.

Based in Johannesburg, Gauteng, most of the group's operations lie to the northwest and northeast of the city. A majority of the company's operations take place in the Bushveld Igneous Complex, a large region that contains a range of mineral commodities including chromium, vanadium, titaniferous magnetite and platinum group metals.

== History ==
The company was formed when Johannesburg Consolidated Investments unbundled in 1995. Its platinum interests became Amplats, later renamed Anglo American Platinum. Anglo American was the company's majority shareholder.

On 5 October 2012, Anglo American Platinum made 12,967 striking South African miners redundant. In July 2014, Amplats announced it would sell many of its South African mines following the negative effect of five months' worth of strikes on the firm's hopes of becoming profitable.

The company was demerged from Anglo American, as Valterra Platinum, on 31 May 2025.

== Controversies ==
=== Treatment of indigenous people ===
Anglo American Platinum filed SLAPPs (Strategic Lawsuit Against Public Participation) against a South African public interest lawyer Richard Spoor, who represented indigenous communities affected by platinum mining on tribal land. The actions include an application in the High Court for a so-called gagging order, ostensibly to prevent him further injuring the good name and reputation of the corporation, the lodging of complaints with the Law Society of unprofessional behaviour and the lodging of a civil action for damages for some $500,000. Anglo American Platinum also obtained an ex parte (without notice) order interdicting two tribal chiefs from interfering with their mining operations and had them arrested on charges of intimidation and trespass. Subsequently, followers of the two tribal chiefs were shot, beaten and arrested for protesting the mine's presence on tribal land.

In August 2007, British charity War on Want published a report accusing Anglo American Platinum's parent company Anglo American of profiting from the abuse of people in the developing countries in which the company operates. In the report, Anglo American Platinum is accused of displacing communities in South Africa, including forcing the entire Magobading community off its land and into the Mecklenberg township.

=== Union related violence ===
In September 2012, following the Marikana massacre in which thirty-four workers were fatally shot by the South African Police Service, workers at Anglo American Platinum staged a strike demanding wage increases at Anglo's partially owned Rustenburg mine. Mametlwe Sebei, a community representative, said in response to protests that at the mine "the mood here is upbeat, very celebratory. Victory is in sight. The workers are celebrating Lonmin as a victory." The strikers carried traditional weapons such as spears and machetes, before being dispersed by police using tear gas, stun grenades and rubber bullets against the "illegal gathering", according to police spokesman Dennis Adriao. Central Methodist Church Bishop Paul Verry said that one woman who was struck by a bullet died. At the same time, an unnamed organiser for the Association of Mineworkers and Construction Union of protests at Impala Platinum said: "We want management to meet us as well now. We want 9,000 rand a month as a basic wage instead of the roughly 5,000 rand we are getting." Anglo Platinum then said in a statement that: "Anglo American Platinum has communicated to its employees the requirement to return to work by the night shift on Thursday 20 September, failing which legal avenues will be pursued."

A wave of strikes occurred across the South African mining sector. As of early October, analysts estimated that approximately 75,000 miners were on strike from various gold and platinum mines and companies across South Africa, most of them illegally. Citing workers failing to attend disciplinary hearings, on 5 October 2012, Anglo American Platinum—the world's biggest platinum producer—announced that it would fire 12,000 people. It said it would do so after losing 39,000 ounces in output – or 700 million rand ($82.3 million; £51 million) in revenue. The ANC Youth League expressed anger at the company and pledged solidarity with those who had been fired:

This action demonstrates the insensibility and insensitivity of the company... which has made astronomical profits on the blood, sweat and tears of the very same workers that today the company can just fire with impunity. Amplats is a disgrace and a disappointment to the country at large, a representation of white monopoly capital out of touch and uncaring of the plight of the poor.

Reuters described the move as "a high-stakes attempt by the world's biggest platinum producer to push back at a wave of illegal stoppages sweeping through the country's mining sector and beyond". The announcement made the rand fall to a 3 1/2-year low. The events were expected to put further political pressure on President Jacob Zuma ahead of the leadership vote in December's ANC National Conference.

According to the Bench Marks Foundation, the violence erupted against a backdrop of a lack of employment opportunities for local youth, squalid living conditions, unemployment and growing inequalities. It claimed the workers were exploited and this was a motivation for the violence. It also criticised the high profits when compared with the low wages of the workers.

In late January 2014 thousands of employees belonging to Anglo American Platinum and other platinum mines went on strike, demanding a basic salary of R12,500 ($880), the same salary that miners wanted in 2012. The five-month-long platinum strike resulted in the deaths of four people, six stabbings, and 24 billion rand ($2.25 billion) in lost revenue for the South African platinum industry. The GDP of South Africa contracted in the first quarter of 2014, pulled down by the steepest drop in mining production, 25% of which 19% was directly attributable to the strike, in 50 years. It was the first contraction since 2009. Workers, most of whom already lived in poverty, lost around 10.6 billion rand ($1 billion) in wages.

== Carbon footprint ==
Anglo American Platinum reported Total CO2e emissions (Direct + Indirect) for the twelve months ending 31 December 2020 at 3,943 Kt (-493 /-11.1% y-o-y). Emissions have been on a declining trend since 2015.

Anglo American Platinum's annual Total CO2e emissions (Direct + Indirect) (in kilotonnes)
Dec 2014	Dec 2015	Dec 2016	Dec 2017	Dec 2018	Dec 2019	Dec 2020
5,363	5,878	5,579	4,612	4,118	4,436	3,943
