= Lower oceanic crust =

The lower oceanic crust is the lower part of the oceanic crust and represents the major part of it (the largest part by volume). It is generally located 4–8 km below the ocean floor and the major lithologies are mafic (ultramafic and gabbroic rocks) which derive from melts rising from the Earth's mantle. This part of the oceanic crust is an important zone for processes such as melt accumulation and melt modification (fractional crystallisation and crustal assimilation). The recycling of this part of the oceanic crust, together with the upper mantle has been suggested as a significant source component for tholeiitic magmas in Hawaiian volcanoes. Although the lower oceanic crust builds the link between the mantle and the MORB, and can't be neglected for the understanding of MORB evolution, the complex processes operating in this zone remain unclear and there is an ongoing debate in Earth Sciences about this. It is 6KM long.

== Processes ==
The lower oceanic crust connects the Earth's mantle with the MORB, where around 60% of the total magma production of the Earth happens. The three main processes happening in this region of the oceanic crust are partial melting of the Earth's mantle, melt accumulation at various depths and the chemical modification of this melts during ascent,. This three processes do not happen in a strict order but occur all simultaneously over a depth range of 4–18 km suggesting that these processes can occur already in the upper mantle. The mantle melts are most commonly modified by fractional crystallisation due to cooling and by assimilation of crustal rocks.

== Spreading rates ==
The most important parameter controlling the processes operating in the lower oceanic crust is the magma supply, this is further controlled by the spreading rate, and therefore, spreading rate is a critical variable in models for the formation of the lower oceanic crust. The rate at which plate divergence occurs at mid-ocean ridges is not the same for all ridge segments. Ridges with a spreading rate less than 3 cm/a are considered slow-spreading ridges, while those with a rate greater than 5 cm/a are considered fast-spreading ridges

=== Fast-spreading ridges ===
Intensive search spanning over three decades of seismic imaging have shown that the ridge axis is underlain by a crystal mush containing a small percentage of melt, capped by a thin melt lens containing a generally high, but variable melt fraction. The completely liquid body is a thin and narrow sill-like lens (10 to 150 m [33 to 492 ft] thick and < 2 km [1.2 mi] wide). The lens is maintained by reinjection of primitive magma. The lack of any detectable large magma chamber and the common detection of small lens/mush zone at fast-spreading ridges emphasize the small magma chamber model. Modally and compositionally layered gabbroic rock is often found (or abundant) in the lower crustal sections of ophiolite. The layered lower crust is thus one of the key features of all models of fast-spreading lower crust. Nevertheless, distinct modal layering as observed in major ophiolites has rarely been observed or sampled on the ocean floor. The IODP expedition 345 was one of the first drilling project, which sampled a significant thickness of layered igneous rocks. A shallow melt can erupt through cool crust and produce sheeted dikes and volcanics, but the small chamber seems difficult to resolve with traditional ideas of fractional crystallization and crystal settling to form the thick sequence of layered gabbros and foliated gabbros and ultramafics. One proposed model is the so-called "gabbro glacier", where crystals settle in a shallow melt-dominated lens beneath the ridge axis. The weight of the accumulating crystals settling to the bottom of the magma lens induces a ductile flow and deformation within the gabbros, just like the ice in a glacier responds to accumulated snow. Nevertheless, the model fails to explain the layered variations in mineral types, the correlated layering in mineral compositional variations, and the apparently primary near-vertical fabrics in the upper gabbros that appear to represent subvertical melt conduits. Kelemen and co-workers concluded that most of the lower oceanic crust crystallized in place, and proposed "the sheeted sill" model. In the model the sills form when porous flow of rising basaltic liquids (or small melt-filled fractures) are stopped beneath permeability (earth sciences) barriers of earlier crystallized melts and pond to form the sills. Cooling rates are generally sufficiently slow that crystals and their interstitial liquids are in chemical equilibrium, as long as the liquid is immobile. However, buoyancy and/or compaction (geology) may induce liquid migration through the mush, resulting a significant compositional and microstructural modification.

=== Slow-spreading ridges ===
Slow- and intermediate-spreading ridges form typically valleys about 30 to 50 km (19 to 31 mi) wide and 1 to 5 km (0.62 to 3.11 mi) deep, with step-like inward-facing scarps, similar to rift valleys on land. Compared to fast spreading-ridges, the magma supply and therefore the heat flow is low and can't maintain a persistent liquid magma chamber. Sinton and Detrick (1992) modelled a schematic cross section of an axial magma chamber beneath a slow-spreading ridge such as the Mid-Atlantic Ridge. Due to the reduced heat and magma supply, a steady-state eruptible magma lens is relinquished in favor of a sill-like mush zone and a smaller transition zone beneath the well-developed rift valley. Convection and mixing in the magma chamber is far less likely than at fast ridges. Thermal constrains led to the development of different models to reconstruct the accretion history. The "infinite leek" model suggests small magma batches, forming small "nested" intrusions. Another model proposed that crystallization could occur at depth, where temperatures are higher, the formed cumulates are then "dragged" up by mantle flow to form the lower oceanic crust. Today, a model intermediate between these two has become popular. This model is referred to as a "plum pudding", where the lower oceanic crust is constructed from a number of nested plutons that crystallize within the mantle or crust. Schwartz et al. (2005) describes another variant. He postulates that the lower crust is constructed both from the nested shallow-level plutons and from the products of deeper-seated crystallization
