= Compatibility (geochemistry) =

Partitioning of elements in a mineral

Compatibility is a term used by geochemists to describe how elements partition themselves in the solid and melt within Earth's mantle. In geochemistry, compatibility is a measure of how readily a particular trace element substitutes for a major element within a mineral.

Compatibility of an ion is controlled by two things: its valence and its ionic radius. Both must approximate those of the major element for the trace element to be compatible in the mineral. For instance, olivine (an abundant mineral in the upper mantle) has the chemical formula (Mg,Fe)_{2}SiO_{4}. Nickel, with very similar chemical behaviour to iron and magnesium, substitutes readily for them and hence is very compatible in the mantle.

Compatibility controls the partitioning of different elements during melting. The compatibility of an element in a rock is a weighted average of its compatibility in each of the minerals present. By contrast, an incompatible element is one that is least stable within its crystal structure. If an element is incompatible in a rock, it partitions into a melt as soon as melting begins. In general, when an element is referred to as being “compatible” without mentioning what rock it is compatible in, the mantle is implied. Thus incompatible elements are those that are enriched in the continental crust and depleted in the mantle. Examples include: rubidium, barium, uranium, and lanthanum. Compatible elements are depleted in the crust and enriched in the mantle, with examples nickel and titanium.

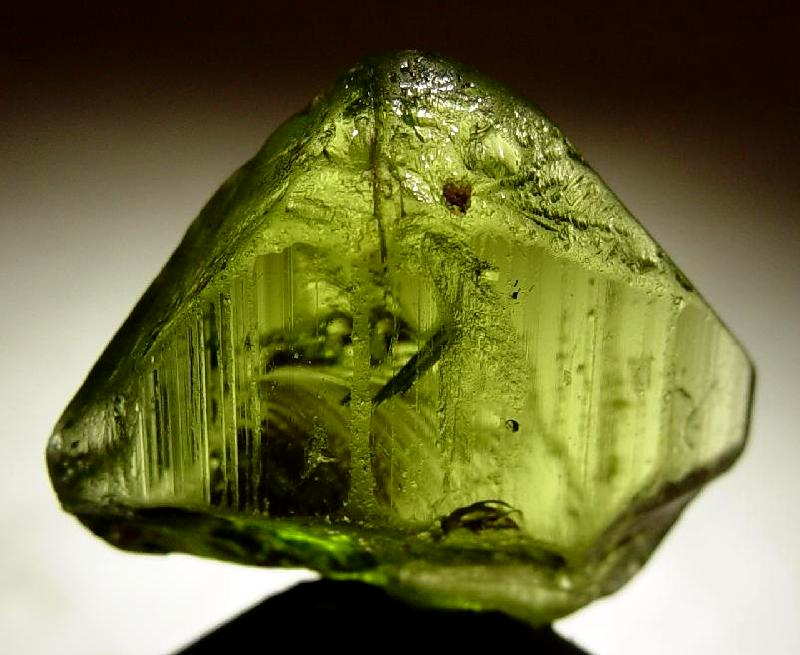
Forsterite olivine, a magnesium iron silicate mineral formed in Earth's upper mantle

Compatibility is commonly described by an element's distribution coefficient. A distribution coefficient describes how the solid and liquid phases of an element will distribute themselves in a mineral. Current studies of Earth's rare trace elements seek to quantify and examine the chemical composition of elements in the Earth's crust. There are still uncertainties in the understanding of the lower crust and upper mantle region of Earth's interior. In addition, numerous studies have focused on looking at the partition coefficients of certain elements in the basaltic magma to characterize the composition of oceanic crust. By having a way to measure the composition of elements in the crust and mantle given a mineral sample, compatibility allows relative concentrations of a particular trace element to be determined. From a petrological point of view, the understanding of how major and trace elements differentiate in the melt provides deeper understanding of Earth's chemical evolution over the geologic time scale.

== Quantifying compatibility ==
=== Distribution (Partition) coefficient ===
Abundance of elements in the Earth's crust. The x-axis displays the atomic number, plotted against the abundance measured per million silicon atoms.

In a mineral, nearly all elements distribute unevenly between the solid and liquid phase. This phenomenon known as chemical fractionation and can be described by an equilibrium constant, $K$ which sets a fixed distribution of an element between any two phases at equilibrium. A distribution constant $K_D$ is used to define the relationship between the solid and liquid phase of a reaction. This value is essentially a ratio of the concentration of an element between two phases, typically between the solid and liquid phase in this context. This constant is often referred to as $D$ when dealing with trace elements, where

$K_D=\frac{C_S}{C_L}=\frac{X_i^{solid}}{X_i^{liquid}}$

$K_D=D$ for trace elements

The equilibrium constant is an empirically determined value. These values depend on temperature, pressure, and composition of the mineral melt. $D$ values differ considerably between major elements and trace elements. By definition, incompatible trace elements have an equilibrium constant value of less than one because trace elements have higher concentrations in the melt than solids. This means that compatible elements have a value of $D>1$. Thus, incompatible elements are concentrated in the melt, whereas compatible elements tend to be concentrated in the solid. Compatible elements with $D\gg1$ are strongly fractionated and have very low concentrations in the liquid phase.

=== Bulk distribution coefficient ===
The bulk distribution coefficient is used to calculate the elemental composition for any element that makes up a mineral in a rock. The bulk distribution coefficient, $\overline{D}_i$, is defined as

$\overline{D}_i=\Sigma W_AD_i^A$

where $i$ is the element of interest in the mineral, and $W_A$ is the weight fraction of mineral $A$ in the rock. $D_i^A$ is the distribution coefficient for the element in mineral $A$. This constant can be used to describe how individual elements in a mineral is concentrated in two different phases. During chemical fractionation, certain elements may become more or less concentrated, which can allow geochemists to quantify the different stages of magma differentiation. Ultimately, these measurements can be used to provide further understanding of elemental behavior in different geologic settings.

== Applications ==
One of the main sources of information about the Earth's composition comes from understanding the relationship between peridotite and basalt melting. Peridotite makes up most of Earth's mantle. Basalt, which is highly concentrated in the Earth's oceanic crust, is formed when magma reaches the Earth's surface and cools down at a very fast rate. When magma cools, different minerals crystallize at different times depending on the cooling temperature of that respective mineral. This ultimately changes the chemical composition of the melt as different minerals begin to crystallize. Fractional crystallization of elements in basaltic liquids has also been studied to observe the composition of lava in the upper mantle. This concept can be applied by scientists to give insight on the evolution of Earth's mantle and how concentrations of lithophile trace elements have varied over the last 3.5 billion years.

=== Understanding the Earth's interior ===
Previous studies have used compatibility of trace elements to see the effect it would have on the melt structure of the peridotite solidus. In such studies, partition coefficients of specific elements were examined and the magnitude of these values gave researchers some indication about the degree of polymerization of the melt. A study conducted in East China in 1998 looked at the chemical composition of various elements found in the crust in China. One of the parameters used to characterize and describe the crustal structure in this region was compatibility of various element pairs. Essentially, studies like this showed how compatibility of certain elements can change and be affected by the chemical compositions and conditions of Earth's interior.

Oceanic volcanism is another topic that commonly incorporates the use of compatibility. Since the 1960s, the structure of Earth's mantle started being studied by geochemists. The oceanic crust, which is rich in basalts from volcanic activity, shows distinct components that provide information about the evolution of the Earth's interior over the geologic timescale. Incompatible trace elements become depleted when mantle melts and become enriched in oceanic or continental crust through volcanic activity. Other times, volcanism can produce enriched mantle melt onto the crust. These phenomena can be quantified by looking at radioactive decay records of isotopes in these basalts, which is a valuable tool for mantle geochemists. More specifically, the geochemistry of serpentinites along the ocean floor, specifically subduction zones, can be examined using compatibility of specific trace elements. The compatibility of lead (Pb) into zircons under different environments can also be an indication of zircons in rocks. When observing levels of non-radiogenic lead in zircons, this can be a useful tool for radiometric dating of zircons.
