= Flux melting =

Reduction in melting point of solid rock

In igneous petrology and volcanology, flux melting occurs when water and other volatile components are introduced to hot solid rock, depressing the solidus. In engineering and metallurgy, flux is a substance, such as salt, that produces a low melting point (liquidus) mixture with a metal oxide. In the same way, the addition of water and other volatile compounds to rocks composed of silicate minerals lowers the melting temperature (solidus) of those rocks. This process is also used heavily in metallurgy to remove impurities and improve the flow of the metal.

In subduction zones, the ultramafic rock of the upper mantle is melted by the addition of volatiles from the subducting plate. The subducting oceanic crust carries water and other volatiles into the mantle, primarily in the form of hydrous minerals which form as a result of the interaction of oceanic crust and seawater. Bound in the subducting crust, these volatiles are released by metamorphic dewatering into the overlying mantle wedge. The partial melting triggered by the incorporation of volatiles produces mafic magma which rises and differentiates forming the igneous and volcanic rocks of the overlying volcanic arc.
