= Flow banding =

Bands or layers that can sometimes be seen in rock that formed from magma

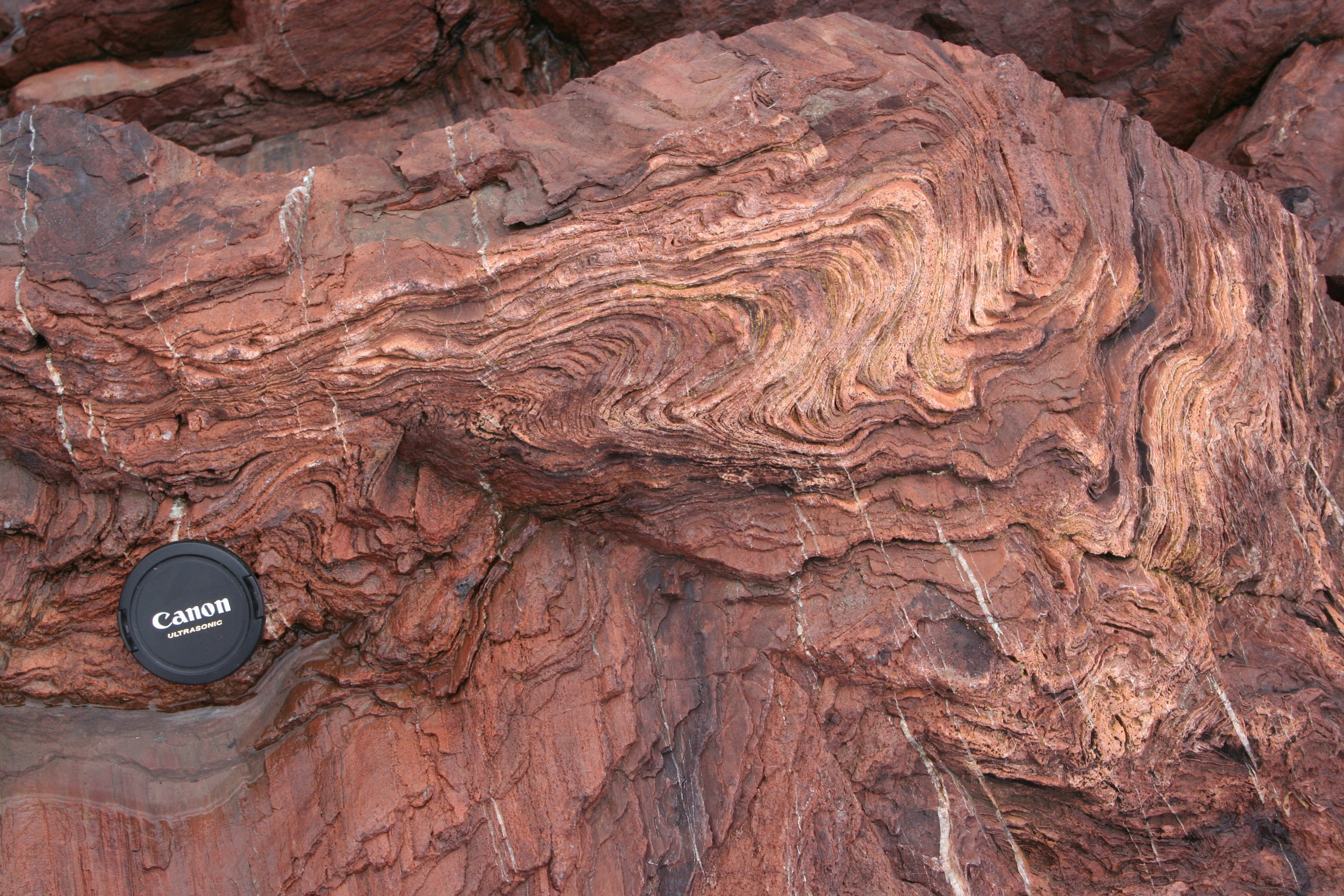
Flow-banded rhyolite in the Dunn Point Formation (Ordovician) exposed near Arisaig, Nova Scotia

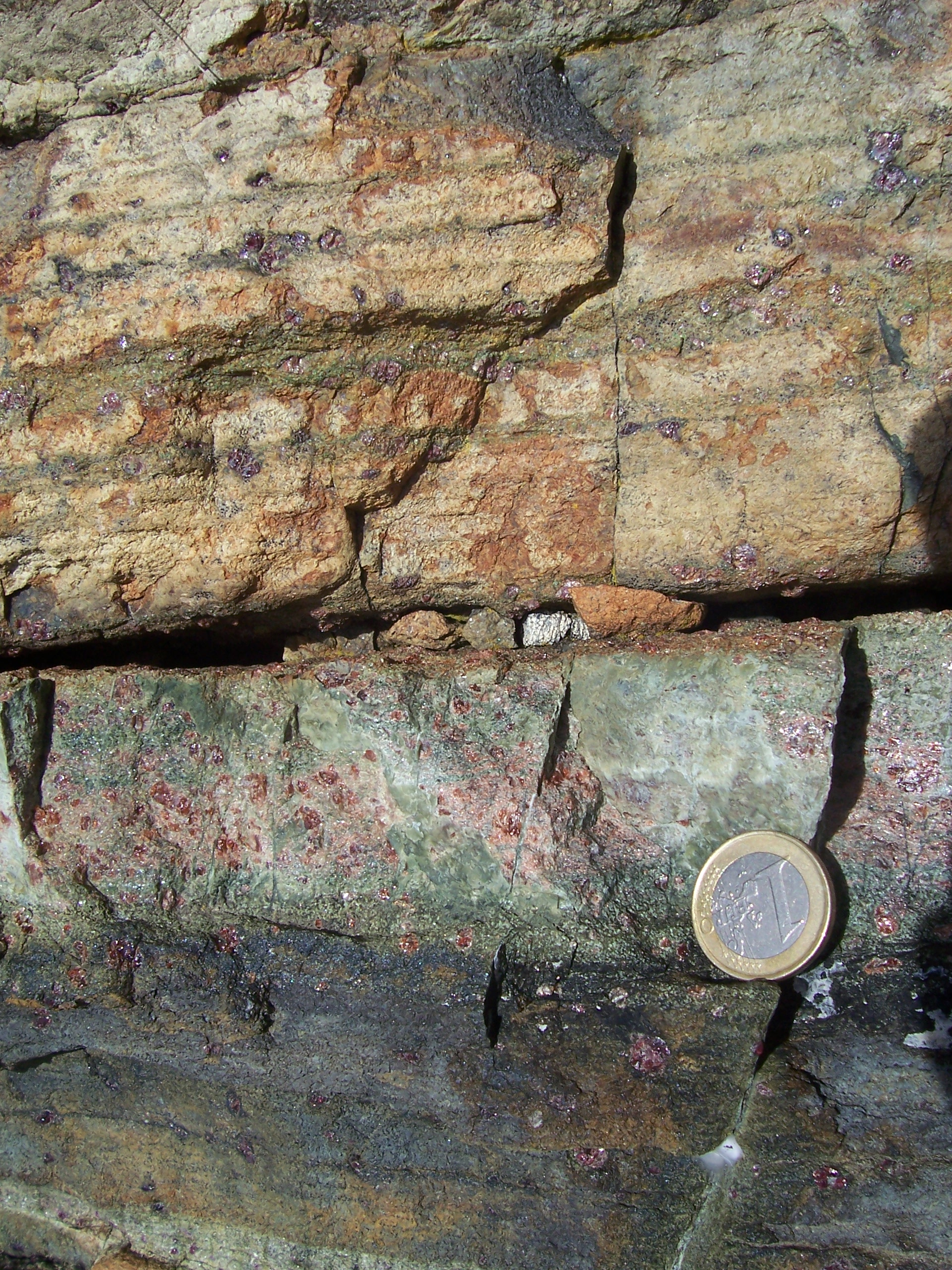
Flow banding at the rim of a peridotite intrusion. Dark and green pyroxenite bands at the bottom represent the melt, brownish lherzolite bands at the top the solid phase. Near Midsund, Norway, 1 euro coin for scale.

Flow banding is a geological term to describe bands or layers that can sometimes be seen in rock that formed from magma or lava (molten rock).

Flow banding is caused by friction of the viscous magma that is in contact with a solid rock interface, usually the wall rock to an intrusive chamber or, if the magma is erupted, the surface of the Earth across which the lava is flowing.

The friction and viscosity of the magma causes phenocrysts and xenoliths within the magma or lava to slow down near the interface and become trapped in a viscous layer. This forms laminar flow, which manifests as a banded, streaky appearance.

Flow banding also results from the process of fractional crystallization that occurs by convection if the crystals that are caught in the flow-banded margins are removed from the melt. This can change the composition of the melt in large intrusions, leading to differentiation.

In layered intrusions, flow banding can occur with crystal accumulation, forming pseudo-sedimentary structures.

== See also ==
- Cumulate rock
- Igneous differentiation
