= Oceanic crust =

Uppermost layer of the oceanic portion of a tectonic plate

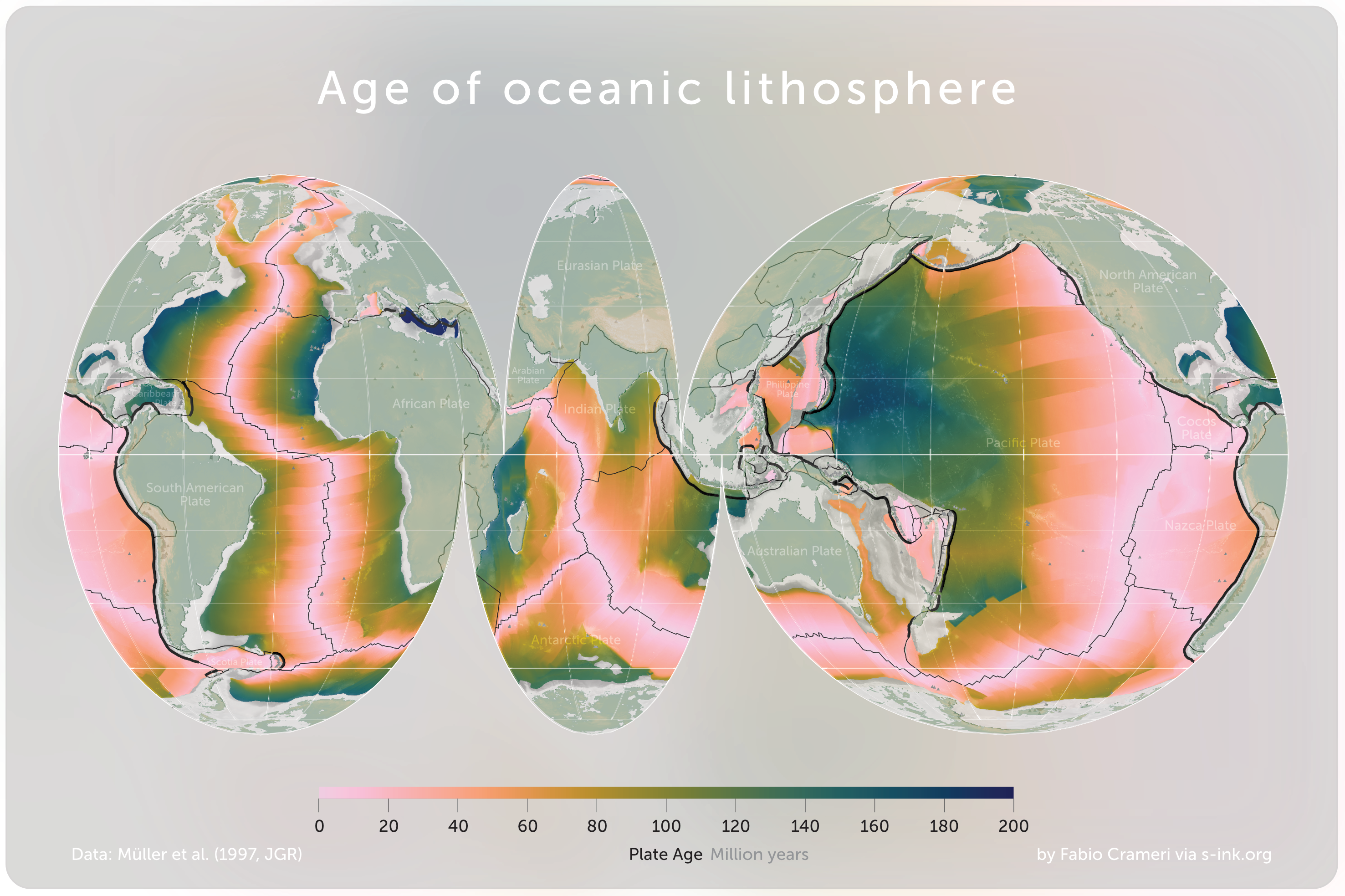
Map of the Earth's oceanic crust, with colours indicating the age of the crust. Lighter shades indicate younger age, and darker shades indicate older age. The lines represent tectonic plate boundaries.

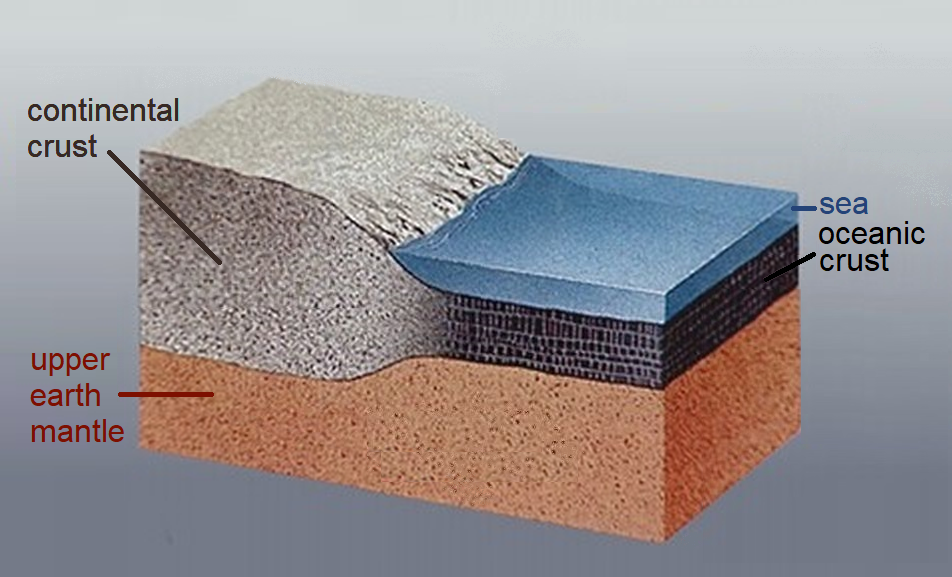
Continental and oceanic crust on the Earth's upper mantle

Oceanic crust is the uppermost layer of the oceanic portion of the tectonic plates. It is composed of the upper oceanic crust, with pillow lavas and a dike complex, and the lower oceanic crust, composed of troctolite, gabbro and ultramafic cumulates. The crust lies above the rigid uppermost layer of the mantle. The crust and the rigid upper mantle layer together constitute oceanic lithosphere.

Oceanic crust is primarily composed of mafic rocks, or sima, which is rich in iron and magnesium. It is thinner than continental crust, or sial, generally less than 10 kilometers thick; however, it is denser, having a mean density of about 3.0 grams per cubic centimeter as opposed to continental crust which has a density of about 2.7 grams per cubic centimeter.

The uppermost crust is the result of the cooling of magma derived from mantle material below the plate. The magma is injected into the spreading center, which consists mainly of a partly solidified crystal mush derived from earlier injections, forming magma lenses that are the source of the sheeted dikes that feed the overlying pillow lavas. As the lavas cool they are, in most instances, modified chemically by seawater. These eruptions occur mostly at mid-ocean ridges, but also at scattered hotspots, and also in rare but powerful occurrences known as flood basalt eruptions. But most magma crystallises at depth, within the lower oceanic crust. There, newly intruded magma can mix and react with pre-existing crystal mush and rocks.

== Composition ==
Although a complete section of oceanic crust has not yet been drilled, geologists have several pieces of evidence that help them understand the ocean floor. Estimations of composition are based on analyses of ophiolites (sections of oceanic crust that are thrust onto and preserved on the continents), comparisons of the seismic structure of the oceanic crust with laboratory determinations of seismic velocities in known rock types, and samples recovered from the ocean floor by submersibles, dredging (especially from ridge crests and fracture zones) and drilling. Oceanic crust is significantly simpler than continental crust and generally can be divided in three layers. According to mineral physics experiments, at lower mantle pressures, oceanic crust becomes denser than the surrounding mantle.

- Layer 1 is on an average 0.4 km thick. It consists of unconsolidated or semiconsolidated sediments, usually thin or even not present near the mid-ocean ridges but thicker farther away from the ridge. Near the continental margins sediment is terrigenous, meaning derived from the land, unlike deep sea sediments which are made of tiny shells of marine organisms, usually calcareous and siliceous, or it can be made of volcanic ash and terrigenous sediments transported by turbidity currents.
- Layer 2 could be divided into two parts: Layer 2A is a 0.5 km thick uppermost volcanic layer of glassy to finely crystalline basalt, usually in the form of pillow basalt. Layer 2B is a 1.5 km thick layer composed of diabase dikes.
- Layer 3 is formed by slow cooling of magma beneath the surface and consists of coarse grained gabbro and cumulate ultramafic rocks. It constitutes over two-thirds of oceanic crust volume with almost 5 km thickness.

=== Geochemistry ===
The most voluminous volcanic rocks of the ocean floor are the mid-oceanic ridge basalts, which are derived from low-potassium tholeiitic magmas. These rocks have low concentrations of large ion lithophile elements (LILE), light rare earth elements (LREE), volatile elements and other highly incompatible elements. There can be found basalts enriched with incompatible elements, but they are rare and associated with mid-ocean ridge hot spots such as surroundings of Galapagos Islands, the Azores and Iceland.

Prior to the Neoproterozoic Era 1000 million years ago, the world's oceanic crust was more mafic than the current crust. The more mafic nature of the crust meant that higher amounts of water molecules (OH) could be stored in the altered parts of the crust. At subduction zones this mafic crust was prone to metamorphose into greenschist instead of blueschist at ordinary blueschist facies.

=== Life cycle ===
Oceanic crust is continuously being created at mid-ocean ridges. As continental plates diverge at these ridges, magma rises into the upper mantle and crust. As the continental plates move away from the ridge, the newly formed rocks cool and start to erode with sediment gradually building up on top of them. The youngest oceanic rocks are at the oceanic ridges, and they get progressively older away from the ridges.

As the mantle rises it cools and melts, as the pressure decreases and it crosses the solidus. The amount of melt produced depends only on the temperature of the mantle as it rises. Hence most oceanic crust is the same thickness (7±1 km). Very slow spreading ridges (<1 cm·yr^{−1} half-rate) produce thinner crust (4–5 km thick) as the mantle has a chance to cool on upwelling and so it crosses the solidus and melts at lesser depth, thereby producing less melt and thinner crust. An example of this is the Gakkel Ridge under the Arctic Ocean. Thicker than average crust is found above plumes as the mantle is hotter and hence it crosses the solidus and melts at a greater depth, creating more melt and a thicker crust. An example of this is Iceland which has crust of thickness ~20 km.

The age of the oceanic crust can be used to estimate the (thermal) thickness of the lithosphere, where young oceanic crust has not had enough time to cool the mantle beneath it, while older oceanic crust has thicker mantle lithosphere beneath it. The oceanic lithosphere subducts at what are known as convergent boundaries. These boundaries can exist between oceanic lithosphere on one plate and oceanic lithosphere on another, or between oceanic lithosphere on one plate and continental lithosphere on another. In the second situation, the oceanic lithosphere always subducts because the continental lithosphere is less dense. The subduction process consumes older oceanic lithosphere, so oceanic crust is seldom more than 200 million years old. The process of super-continent formation and destruction via repeated cycles of creation and destruction of oceanic crust is known as the Wilson Cycle.

The oldest large-scale oceanic crust is in the west Pacific and north-west Atlantic — both are about up to 180-200 million years old. However, parts of the eastern Mediterranean Sea could be remnants of the much older Tethys Ocean, at about 270 and up to 340 million years old.

== Magnetic anomalies ==
The oceanic crust displays a pattern of magnetic lines, parallel to the ocean ridges, frozen in the basalt. A symmetrical pattern of positive and negative magnetic lines emanates from the mid-ocean ridge. New rock is formed by magma at the mid-ocean ridges, and the ocean floor spreads out from this point. When the magma cools to form rock, its magnetic polarity is aligned with the then-current positions of the magnetic poles of the Earth. New magma then forces the older cooled magma away from the ridge. This process results in parallel sections of oceanic crust of alternating magnetic polarity.

== See also ==
- Continental crust
- Lithosphere
- Mohorovičić discontinuity
- Plate tectonics
- Seabed 2030
- Seafloor depth versus age
