= Crystal mush =

Type of magma

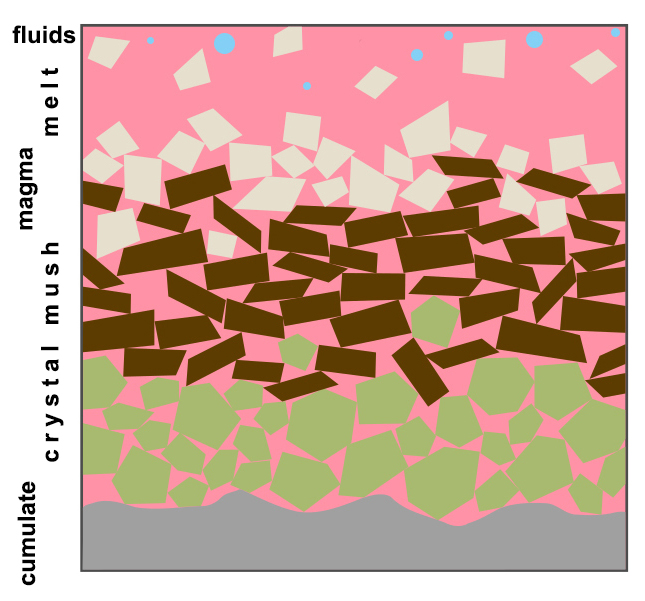
During cooling, crystals will form from the melt. Thus, the crystal/melt ratio increases, generating a magma, a crystal-mush, and finally a cumulate rock.

A crystal mush is magma that contains a significant amount of crystals (up to 50% of the volume) suspended in the liquid phase (melt). As the crystal fraction makes up less than half of the volume, there is no rigid large-scale three-dimensional network as in solids. As such, their rheological behavior mirrors that of absolute liquids.

Within a single crystal mush, there is grading to a higher solid fraction towards the margins of the pluton, while the liquid fraction increases towards the uppermost portions, forming a liquid lens at the top. Furthermore, depending on depth of placement crystal mushes are likely to contain a larger portion of crystals at greater depth in the crust than at shallower depth, as melting occurs from the adiabatic decompression of the magma as it rises, this is particularly the case for mid-ocean ridges.

Seismic investigation offers strong evidence for the existence of crystal mushes rather than fully liquid magmatic bodies.

Crystal mushes can have a wide range of mineral and chemical compositions, from mafic (SiO_{2}-poor, MgO-rich) to felsic (SiO_{2}-rich, MgO-poor).

== Formation ==
Crystal mushes form at various depths in the Earth's crust. They result from fractional crystallization of a fluid. Fractional crystallization is a physical and chemical process that generates a liquid and a solid phase from a specific initial chemical solution. Depending on the initial chemical composition of the liquid, the melt is going to generate different minerals.

The initial fluid can form crystals (solid phase) by cooling down and by adding a certain water's concentration. In subduction zones, more specific in magmatic arcs, it is possible to transport water into the Earth's mantle, as the denser oceanic plate subducts under the other – continental or younger oceanic – plate. Water is a key factor for this geochemical process and has a significant impact on the geotherm of the subducting plate. It causes partial melting of the crust, which will then generate a chamber of liquid phase that will later be crystallized and generate minerals.

The source of water stays in minerals that contain H_{2}O in their chemical compositions.

Another key factor is the concentration of silica in the magma, which leads to the differentiation of magma. At the end of the crystallization is possible to crystallize quartz, but only when the melt contains a high concentration of SiO_{2}, which is the main component of the mineral.

The rapid increase in the crystal content over a short temperature interval generates ideal rheological conditions for melt extraction. The buoyant, lighter magmas extracted from the crystal mush can ascend through the crust and form plutonic complexes.

== Extraction ==
The crystal mush model presents a view of plutons as crystal graveyards. This implies that the crystals are separated from the silicate liquid where they were crystallised. This model contrasts with the view of intrusive magma bodies as failed eruptions. Upon cooling, a crystal mush may experience different Igneous differentiation processes, such as crystal fractionation, mixing, melting.

To create an accumulation of crystals, there has to be a mechanism that extracts the interstitial liquid from the already crystallised solids. There is an increase in the solid portion of the magma chamber with decreasing temperature. This implies that the permeability lowers with temperature. This also halts convection in the system, and the progressive accumulation of crystals increases the efficiency of expulsion of melt from the underlying parts of the chamber due to loading. These mechanisms contribute to the decoupling of behaviour between crystals and liquid, enabling the liquid to percolate upwards.

This extraction mechanism, however, operates in an optimal interval of crystal fraction. If there is a low crystal fraction, convection still operates in the system, thus halting crystal settling and liquid extraction. However, if the crystal fraction is very high, the system starts behaving like a solid within the timescales of applied stress in the system (Maxwell time).

== Eruption ==
Since magma comprise different compositional fractions, it may undergo different processes like melt extraction, phase separation, water and gas enrichment, and injection of magma from deeper magma chambers (typically within the lower crust). All these may directly or indirectly cause the eruption events.

One of the factors that can initiate magma eruption is phase separation of the liquid and crystal components of the crystal mush. As the magma develops over time and the crystal content of the magma increases, phase separation is taking place and the liquid phase of the magma is pushed up, driven by its buoyancy as a result of its lower density. Volcanoes, as valves of the open system, provide the path for gas release and magma eruption. The amount of dissolved gases may be a further factor that controls the eruption event. The deeper the magma chamber is located, the higher is the amount of gas that can be dissolved in the magma (high pressure conditions), especially in andesitic and rhyolitic magmas. As phase separation occurs and the liquid fraction increases along with decreasing pressure, the emission of gas increases. This process is expressed by a high fraction of bubbles that drive the liquid phase toward the earth surface. In addition, the higher the content of dissolved water and other gases, the more violent the eruption will be.

The last and the most trivial cause for magma eruption is an injection of fresh magma from lower parts of the crust into the issued magma chamber, which increases the content of the liquid phase, and consequently, the pressure inside the chamber, which is concurrently released as a flux of lava onto the earth surface. The “crystal mush” is a leading and most promising model of magma bodies, that supported by findings (ignimbrites) on the surface, although there are some controversial aspects.

== Ore deposits ==
Magmas containing volatiles are stable at high pressures in the deep crust; when this mixture of magma and volatiles rises though the crust the pressure decreases and the volatiles start exsolving from the magma. This leads to oversaturation of volatiles in magma. Also crystallization of dry minerals within the magma and crystal mush will progressively increase the fluid concentration of the melt, possibly leading to saturation. These fluids, lighter than the magma they were once in, exsolve and rise up to even shallower crust; potentially forming ore deposits. If these volatiles are sufficiently concentrated to form ore minerals and if they are trapped by the surrounding host rocks in the continental crust within a narrow enough space, they can form economically valuable ore deposits. Some magmatic chambers are also more predisposed to form large ore deposits, due to regional setting and a combination of factors favorable to ore formation.

A key factor for magma saturation and volatile formation is the sulphide saturation in the original magma. High solubility and high concentration of sulphur in magma lead to high sulphide saturation and could be an important factor in formation of big ore deposits. This saturated sulphide in melt can enrich the concentration of metals in the magmatic derived fluids, e.g., hydrothermal fluids. These can then rise from the magmatic chamber and intrude in the continental crust and deposit their dissolved metals in the crust.

Micro-textural and geochemical analyses are interpreted to directly link ore formation to the flow of mineralising fluids through palaeo-porosity within once permeable crystal mush dykes. It is believed these crystal mush dykes acted as conduits for porphyry copper deposit mineralising fluids from deep portions of underlying magmas.
