= Incompatible element =

Element not easily hosted in a crystal lattice

In petrology and geochemistry, an incompatible element is one that is unsuitable in size and/or charge to the cation sites of the minerals in which it is included. It is defined by a partition coefficient between rock-forming minerals and melt being much smaller than 1.

During the fractional crystallization of magma and magma generation by the partial melting of the Earth's mantle and crust, elements that have difficulty in entering cation sites of the minerals are concentrated in the melt phase of the magma (liquid phase).

Two groups of incompatible elements that have difficulty entering the solid phase are known by acronyms. One group includes elements having large ionic radius, such as potassium, rubidium, caesium, strontium, and barium (called LILE, or large-ion lithophile elements), and the other group includes elements of large ionic valences (or high electrical charges), such as zirconium, niobium, hafnium, rare-earth elements (REE), thorium, uranium and tantalum (called HFSE, or high-field-strength elements).

Another way to classify incompatible elements is by mass (lanthanide series): light rare-earth elements (LREE) are La, Ce, Pr, Nd, and Sm, and heavy rare-earth elements (HREE) are Eu–Lu. Rocks or magmas that are rich, or only slightly depleted, in light rare-earth elements are referred to as "fertile", and those with strong depletions in LREE are referred to as "depleted".

== See also ==
- Compatibility (geochemistry)
