= Intensity-duration-frequency curve =

Mathematical function

An intensity-duration-frequency curve (IDF curve) is a mathematical function that relates the intensity of an event (e.g. rainfall) with its duration and frequency of occurrence. Frequency is the inverse of the probability of occurrence. These curves are commonly used in hydrology for flood forecasting and civil engineering for urban drainage design. However, the IDF curves are also analysed in hydrometeorology because of the interest in the time concentration or time-structure of the rainfall, but it is also possible to define IDF curves for drought events. Additionally, applications of IDF curves to risk-based design are emerging outside of hydrometeorology, for example some authors developed IDF curves for food supply chain inflow shocks to US cities.

== Mathematical approaches ==
The IDF curves can take different mathematical expressions, theoretical or empirically fitted to observed event data. For each duration (e.g. 5, 10, 60, 120, 180 ... minutes), the empirical cumulative distribution function (ECDF), and a determined frequency or return period is set. Therefore, the empirical IDF curve is given by the union of the points of equal frequency of occurrence and different duration and intensity Likewise, a theoretical or semi-empirical IDF curve is one whose mathematical expression is physically justified, but presents parameters that must be estimated by empirical fits.

=== Empirical approaches ===
There is a large number of empirical approaches that relate the intensity (I), the duration (t) and the return period (p), from fits to power laws such as:

- Sherman's formula, with three parameters (a, c and n), which are a function of the return period, p:

$$I(t)=\frac a {(t+c)^n}$$

- Chow's formula, also with three parameters (a, c and n), for a particular return period p:

$$I(t)= \frac a {t^n+c}$$

- Power law according to Aparicio (1997), with four parameters (a, c, m and n), already adjusted for all return periods of interest:

$$I(t,p)=a \cdot \frac{p^m}{(t+c)^n}$$

In hydrometeorology, the simple power law (taking $\ c = 0$) is used as a measure of the time-structure of the rainfall:

$$I(t)=\frac a {t^n} = I_o\left( \frac{t_o} t \right)^n$$

where $\ I_o$ is defined as an intensity of reference for a fixed time $\ t_o$, i.e. $\ a=I_o t_o^n$, and $\ n$ is a non-dimensional parameter known as n-index. In a rainfall event, the equivalent to the IDF curve is called Maximum Averaged Intensity (MAI) curve.

=== Theoretical approaches ===
To get an IDF curves from a probability distribution, $\ F(x)$ it is necessary to mathematically isolate the total amount or depth of the event$\ x$, which is directly related to the average intensity $\ I$ and the duration $\ t$, by the equation $\ x = It$, and since the return period $p$ is defined as the inverse of $\ 1 - F(x)$, the function $\ f(p)$ is found as the inverse of $\ F(x)$, according to:

$$I t =  f(p)   \quad  \Leftarrow \quad  p =  \frac{1}{1-F(I t)}$$

- Power law with the return period, derived from the Pareto distribution, for a fixed duration $\ t$:

$$\ I(p) = kp^m \quad  \Leftarrow \quad  F(It) = 1 - \left( \frac{kt}{It} \right)^{1/m} = 1 - \frac{1}{p}$$

where the Pareto distribution constant has been redefined as$\ k' = k t$, since it is a valid distribution for a specific duration of the event, it has been taken as$\ x = It$.

- Function derived from the generalized Pareto distribution, for a given duration $\ t$:

$$I(p) = \begin{cases}
\mu + \frac \sigma m \cdot (p^m-1) \quad  \Leftarrow \quad  F(I) = 1 - \left(1+ \frac{m(I-\mu)}{\sigma}\right)^{-1/m} = 1 - \frac{1}{p}  & \text{if } m > 0,
\\ \quad  \mu + \sigma\ln(p) \quad   \quad \Leftarrow  \quad  F(I) = 1 - \exp \left( - \frac{I-\mu}{\sigma}\right) = 1 - \frac{1}{p}  & \text{if } m = 0.
\end{cases}$$

Note that for $\ m > 0$ y $\ \mu = \frac \sigma m$, the generalized Pareto distribution retrieves the simple form of the Pareto distribution, with $\ k' = \frac \sigma m$. However, with $\ m = 0$ the exponential distribution is retrieved.

- Function deduced from the Gumbel distribution and the opposite Gumbel distribution, for a given duration $\ t$:

$$I(p) = \mu + \sigma\ln \left( \ln \left(  1 - \frac{1}{p} \right) \right)
\quad   \Leftarrow  \quad  \quad
F(I) = \exp \left( - \exp \left( - \frac{I-\mu} \sigma \right) \right) = 1 - \frac{1}{p}$$
$$I(p) = \mu + \sigma\ln(\ln p)
\quad   \quad  \quad \quad  \quad  \Leftarrow  \quad \quad
F(I) = 1 - \exp \left( - \exp \left(  \frac{I-\mu}{\sigma} \right) \right) = 1 - \frac{1}{p}$$
