= Partial melting =

Phenomenon that occurs in rock

Partial melting is the phenomenon that occurs when a rock is subjected to temperatures high enough to cause certain minerals to melt, but not all of them. Partial melting is an important part of the formation of all igneous rocks and some metamorphic rocks (e.g., migmatites), as evidenced by a multitude of geochemical, geophysical and petrological studies.

The parameters that influence partial melting include the composition of the source rock, the pressure and temperature of the environment, and the availability of water or other fluids. As for the mechanisms that govern partial melting, the main are decompression melting and flux melting. Decompression melting occurs when rocks are brought from higher to lower pressure zones in the Earth's crust, lowering the melting point of its mineral components, thus generating a partial melt. Flux melting, on the other hand, occurs when water and other volatiles get in contact with hot rock, reducing the melting point of minerals, leading to partial melting. With a few exceptions (e.g., Yellowstone), conduction of heat is considered a mechanism too slow and inefficient to partially melt large bodies of rock.

Partial melting is also linked to the formation of ores. Magmatic and hydrothermal ore deposits, such as chromite, Ni-Cu sulfides, rare-metal pegmatites, kimberlites, volcanic-hosted massive sulfide deposits are some examples of valuable natural resources closely related to the conditions of the origin, migration and emplacement of partial melts.

== Parameters ==
A rock with composition C_{B} starts to melt when its temperature is T_{A} and reaches the solidus curve, the temperature below which all the substance is solid. The newly formed liquid phase has an initial composition of C_{L} at T_{A}. As the temperature increases towards T_{B}, the partial melting of the solid phase leads to changes in composition from C_{B} to C_{S} (blue line). As the liquid phase increases, its composition gets closer to the rock’s original composition C_{B} (red line). When the temperature reaches T_{B}, the whole solid phase has melted, characterizing the substance being above the liquidus curve.

Melting in the mantle depends on the following parameters: composition of the rocks, pressure and temperature, and the presence of volatiles.

=== Composition ===
The chemical composition of rocks affects their melting points and the final product of partial melting. For example, the bulk chemistry of melts obtained experimentally from sedimentary rocks, such as shales and graywacke reflects that of the source rocks. Additionally, rocks containing minerals with lower melting points will undergo partial melting more easily under the same conditions of pressure and temperature if compared to minerals with higher melting points.

=== Temperature and pressure ===
Temperature and pressure can have a significant impact on the amount of partial melting that occurs in rocks. When temperature is low, the pressure needs to be low as well for melting to occur, and when temperature is high, the pressure needs to be higher to prevent melting from taking place. Higher pressure can suppress melting, while higher temperature can promote it. The extent to which partial melting occurs depends on the balance between temperature and pressure, with both having a strong influence on the process.

=== Addition of volatiles ===
The presence of volatiles has the potential to significantly reduce solidus temperatures of a given system. This allows for melt to be generated at lower temperatures than otherwise predicted, eliminating the need for a change in pressure or temperature conditions of the system. Furthermore, some consider that volatiles control the stability of minerals and the chemical reactions that happen during partial melting, while others assign a more subordinate role to these components.

== Mechanisms ==
Diagram showing the physical processes inside the Earth that lead to the generation of magma. The plots above show the rate at which the temperature (red line) and the solidus (green line) change based on depth and tectonic setting (A to D).

A close-up showing a mid-ocean ridge with a magma reservoir below. Hot and less dense mantle rocks rise to lower pressure zones leading to decompression melting.

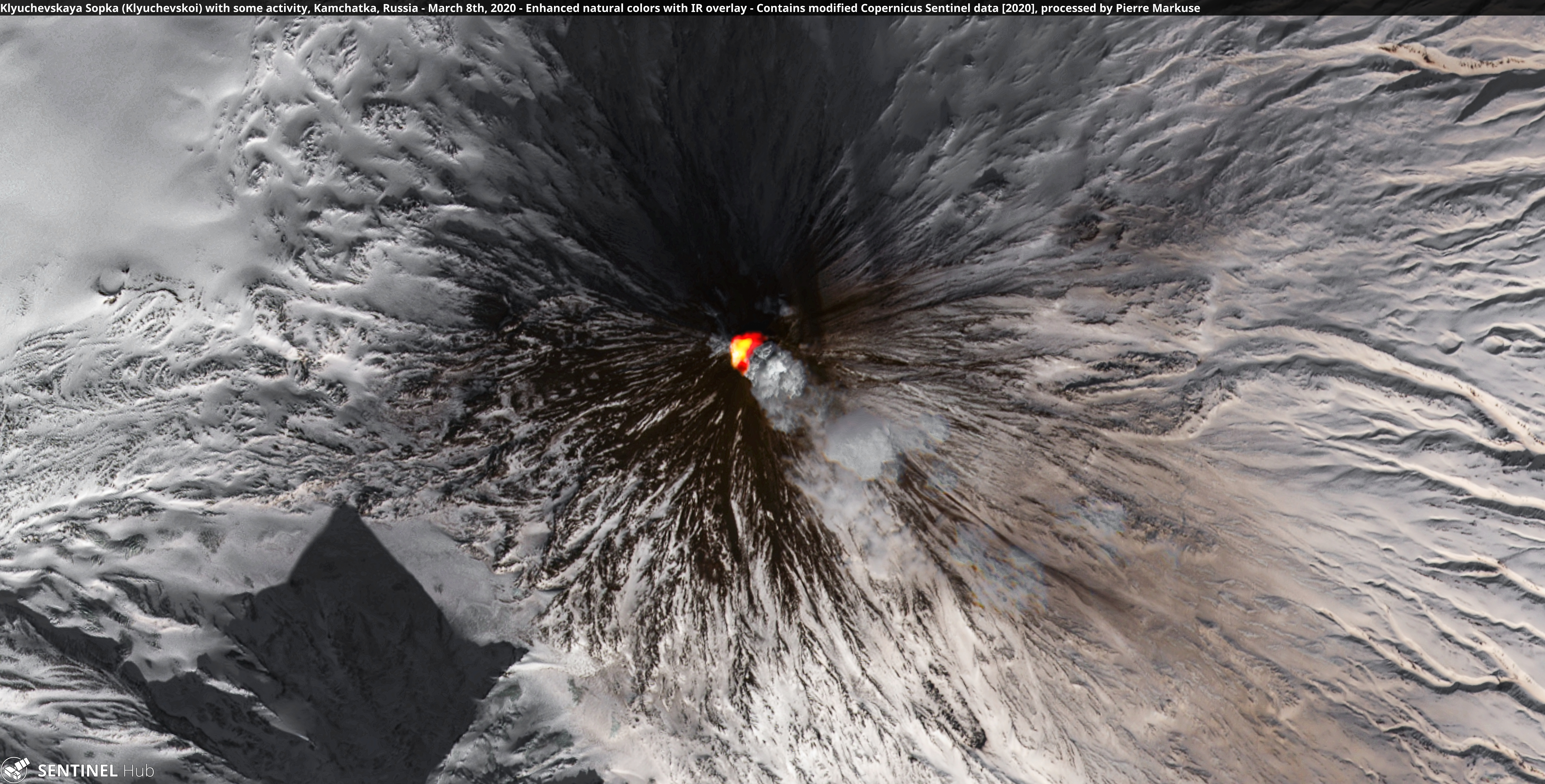
At 4,800 m above sea level, Klyuchevskoi is located in Kamchatka, Russia and is a product of flux melting on a subduction zone.

The main mechanisms responsible for partial melting are decompression melting and flux melting. The first process happens when bodies of rock move from a higher to a lower pressure setting, causing melting of a part of its components, while the second is caused by the addition of fluids that lower the melting point of minerals, leading to their melting at lower temperatures. Although conduction of heat is a known mechanism capable of transferring heat from one body to another, it plays a subordinate role in causing partial melting. This is due to the ineffective heat flow in large rock bodies in the solid portion of the Earth and a lack of heat sources capable of inciting partial melting.

=== Decompression melting ===
Main process responsible for the generation of basaltic melts on certain settings, such as rift zones in continents, back-arc basins, seafloor spreading zones and intraplate hotspots. Plate tectonics and mantle convection are responsible for the transportation of hot and less dense rock towards the surface. This causes a reduction in pressure without loss of heat, leading to partial melting. At seafloor spreading zones (mid-ocean ridges), hot peridotite ascending from the mantle undergoes partial melting due to a decrease in pressure, generating a basaltic melt and a solid phase. This melt when extruded on the surface is responsible for the creation of new oceanic crust. In continental rifts, where the lithosphere is colder and more rigid, decompression melting occurs when material from the hot and more plastic asthenosphere is transported to lower pressures.

=== Flux melting ===
Decompression melting does not explain how volcanoes form above subduction zones, since in this setting there is an increase in pressure when the oceanic plate subducts under a colder oceanic plate or a continental plate. The mechanism that explains melting in this setting is flux melting. In this case, when water, oceanic crustal material and metamorphosed mantle rocks are added into the system, minerals can be melted at lower temperatures. There are arguments that the most efficient way of carrying material from the subducting slab to the volcanic arc on the surface is by melting the slab itself, while other views support that melting occurs between the lithosphere and the slab.

=== Heat conduction ===
Although decompression and flux melting are the main mechanisms causing partial melting, the generation of certain igneous systems, such as large felsic continental magma reservoirs (for example, Yellowstone), are not explained by them. In this case, heat conduction is the mechanism responsible for that. When basaltic melt moves through the continental crust, it can accumulate and partially crystallize. In this event, if sufficient heat is released, it can cause the melting of the surrounding rocks and the creation of felsic magma. The relevance of this phenomenon to the modification of the continental crust is a topic of discussion in the scientific community.

== Significance ==
Partial melting is an important process in geology with respect to the chemical differentiation of crustal rocks. On the Earth, partial melting of the mantle at mid-ocean ridges produces oceanic crust, and partial melting of the mantle and oceanic crust at subduction zones creates continental crust.

Furthermore, the process of partial melting is also associated with the development of a series of ore deposits such as:

- Light rare-earth element (LREE) in carbonatites;
- Chromite deposits;
- Base-metal Ni-Cu sulfide deposits in mafic and ultramafic rocks;
- PGE sulfide deposits;
- Rare-metal pegmatites;
- Diamond deposits in kimberlites and lamproites.
