= Igneous differentiation =

Geologic process in formation of some igneous rocks

In geology, igneous differentiation, or magmatic differentiation, is an umbrella term for the various processes by which magmas undergo bulk chemical change during the partial melting process, cooling, emplacement, or eruption. The sequence of (usually increasingly silicic) magmas produced by igneous differentiation is known as a magma series.

== Definitions ==
=== Primary melts ===
When a rock melts to form a liquid, the liquid is known as a primary melt. Primary melts have not undergone any differentiation and represent the starting composition of a magma. In nature, primary melts are rarely seen. Some leucosomes of migmatites are examples of primary melts. Primary melts derived from the mantle are especially important and are known as primitive melts or primitive magmas. By finding the primitive magma composition of a magma series, it is possible to model the composition of the rock from which a melt was formed, which is important because we have little direct evidence of the Earth's mantle.

=== Parental melts ===
Where it is impossible to find the primitive or primary magma composition, it is often useful to attempt to identify a parental melt. A parental melt is a magma composition from which the observed range of magma chemistries has been derived by the processes of igneous differentiation. It need not be a primitive melt.

For instance, a series of basalt lava flows is assumed to be related to one another. A composition from which they could reasonably be produced by fractional crystallization is termed a parental melt. To prove this, fractional crystallization models would be produced to test the hypothesis that they share a common parental melt.

=== Cumulate rocks ===
Fractional crystallization and accumulation of crystals formed during the differentiation process of a magmatic event are known as cumulate rocks, and those parts are the first which crystallize out of the magma. Identifying whether a rock is a cumulate or not is crucial for understanding if it can be modelled back to a primary melt or a primitive melt, and identifying whether the magma has dropped out cumulate minerals is equally important even for rocks which carry no phenocrysts.

== Underlying causes of differentiation ==
The primary cause of change in the composition of a magma is cooling, which is an inevitable consequence of the magma being formed and migrating from the site of partial melting into an area of lower stress - generally a cooler volume of the crust.

Cooling causes the magma to begin to crystallize minerals from the melt or liquid portion of the magma. Most magmas are a mixture of liquid rock (melt) and crystalline minerals (phenocrysts).

Contamination is another cause of magma differentiation. Contamination can be caused by assimilation of wall rocks, mixing of two or more magmas or even by replenishment of the magma chamber with fresh, hot magma.

The whole gamut of mechanisms for differentiation has been referred to as the FARM process, which stands for fractional crystallization, assimilation, replenishment and magma mixing.

=== Fractional crystallization of igneous rocks ===
Fractional crystallization is the removal and segregation from a melt of mineral precipitates, which changes the composition of the melt. This is one of the most important geochemical and physical processes operating within the Earth's crust and mantle.

Fractional crystallization in silicate melts (magmas) is a very complex process compared to chemical systems in the laboratory because it is affected by a wide variety of phenomena. Prime amongst these are the composition, temperature, and pressure of a magma during its cooling.

The composition of a magma is the primary control on which mineral is crystallized as the melt cools down past the liquidus. For instance in mafic and ultramafic melts, the MgO and SiO_{2} contents determine whether forsterite olivine is precipitated or whether enstatite pyroxene is precipitated.

Two magmas of similar composition and temperature at different pressure may crystallize different minerals. An example is high-pressure and high-temperature fractional crystallization of granites to produce single-feldspar granite, and low-pressure low-temperature conditions which produce two-feldspar granites.

The partial pressure of volatile phases in silicate melts is also of prime importance, especially in near-solidus crystallization of granites.

=== Assimilation ===
Assimilation can be broadly defined as a process where a mass of magma wholly or partially homogenizes with materials derived from the wall rock of the magma body. Assimilation is a popular mechanism to partly explain the felsification of ultramafic and mafic magmas as they rise through the crust: a hot primitive melt intruding into a cooler, felsic crust will melt the crust and mix with the resulting melt. This then alters the composition of the primitive magma. Also, pre-existing mafic host rocks can be assimilated by very hot primitive magmas.

Effects of assimilation on the chemistry and evolution of magma bodies are to be expected, and have been clearly proven in many places. In the early 20th century there was a lively discussion on the relative importance of the process in igneous differentiation. More recent research has shown, however, that assimilation has a fundamental role in altering the trace element and isotopic composition of magmas, in formation of some economically important ore deposits, and in causing volcanic eruptions.

=== Replenishment ===
When a melt undergoes cooling along the liquid line of descent, the results are limited to the production of a homogeneous solid body of intrusive rock, with uniform mineralogy and composition, or a partially differentiated cumulate mass with layers, compositional zones and so on. This behaviour is fairly predictable and easy enough to prove with geochemical investigations. In such cases, a magma chamber will form a close approximation of the ideal Bowen's reaction series. However, most magmatic systems are polyphase events, with several pulses of magmatism. In such a case, the liquid line of descent is interrupted by the injection of a fresh batch of hot, undifferentiated magma. This can cause extreme fractional crystallisation because of three main effects:

- Additional heat provides additional energy to allow more vigorous convection, allows resorption of existing mineral phases back into the melt, and can cause a higher-temperature form of a mineral or other higher-temperature minerals to begin precipitating
- Fresh magma changes the composition of the melt, changing the chemistry of the phases which are being precipitated. For instance, plagioclase conforms to the liquid line of descent by forming initial anorthite which, if removed, changes the equilibrium mineral composition to oligoclase or albite. Replenishment of the magma can see this trend reversed, so that more anorthite is precipitated atop cumulate layers of albite.
- Fresh magma destabilises minerals which are precipitating as solid solution series or on a eutectic; a change in composition and temperature can cause extremely rapid crystallisation of certain mineral phases which are undergoing a eutectic crystallisation phase.

=== Magma mixing ===
Magma mixing is the process by which two magmas meet, comingle, and form a magma of a composition somewhere between the two end-member magmas.

Magma mixing is a common process in volcanic magma chambers, which are open-system chambers where magmas enter the chamber, undergo some form of assimilation, fractional crystallisation and partial melt extraction (via eruption of lava), and are replenished.

Magma mixing also tends to occur at deeper levels in the crust and is considered one of the primary mechanisms for forming intermediate rocks such as monzonite and andesite. Here, due to heat transfer and increased volatile flux from subduction, the silicic crust melts to form a felsic magma (essentially granitic in composition). These granitic melts are known as an underplate. Basaltic primary melts formed in the mantle beneath the crust rise and mingle with the underplate magmas, the result being part-way between basalt and rhyolite; literally an 'intermediate' composition.

=== Other mechanisms of differentiation ===
==== Interface entrapment ====
Convection in a large magma chamber is subject to the interplay of forces generated by thermal convection and the resistance offered by friction, viscosity and drag on the magma offered by the walls of the magma chamber. Often near the margins of a magma chamber which is convecting, cooler and more viscous layers form concentrically from the outside in, defined by breaks in viscosity and temperature. This forms laminar flow, which separates several domains of the magma chamber which can begin to differentiate separately.

Flow banding is the result of a process of fractional crystallization which occurs by convection, if the crystals which are caught in the flow-banded margins are removed from the melt. The friction and viscosity of the magma causes phenocrysts and xenoliths within the magma or lava to slow down near the interface and become trapped in a viscous layer. This can change the composition of the melt in large intrusions, leading to differentiation.

==== Partial melt extraction ====
With reference to the definitions, above, a magma chamber will tend to cool down and crystallize minerals according to the liquid line of descent. When this occurs, especially in conjunction with zonation and crystal accumulation, and the melt portion is removed, this can change the composition of a magma chamber. In fact, this is basically fractional crystallization, except in this case we are observing a magma chamber which is the remnant left behind from which a daughter melt has been extracted.

If such a magma chamber continues to cool, the minerals it forms and its overall composition will not match a sample liquid line of descent or a parental magma composition.

== Typical behaviours of magma chambers ==
It is worth reiterating that magma chambers are not usually static single entities. The typical magma chamber is formed from a series of injections of melt and magma, and most are also subject to some form of partial melt extraction.

Granite magmas are generally much more viscous than mafic magmas and are usually more homogeneous in composition. This is generally considered to be caused by the viscosity of the magma, which is orders of magnitude higher than mafic magmas. The higher viscosity means that, when melted, a granitic magma will tend to move in a larger concerted mass and be emplaced as a larger mass because it is less fluid and able to move. This is why granites tend to occur as large plutons, and mafic rocks as dikes and sills.

Granites are cooler and are therefore less able to melt and assimilate country rocks. Wholesale contamination is therefore minor and unusual, although mixing of granitic and basaltic melts is not unknown where basalt is injected into granitic magma chambers.

Mafic magmas are more liable to flow, and are therefore more likely to undergo periodic replenishment of a magma chamber. Because they are more fluid, crystal precipitation occurs much more rapidly, resulting in greater changes by fractional crystallisation. Higher temperatures also allow mafic magmas to assimilate wall rocks more readily and therefore contamination is more common and better developed.

=== Dissolved gases ===
All igneous magmas contain dissolved gases (water, carbonic acid, hydrogen sulfide, chlorine, fluorine, boric acid, etc.). Of these water is the principal, and was formerly believed to have percolated downwards from the Earth's surface to the heated rocks below, but is now generally admitted to be an integral part of the magma. Many peculiarities of the structure of the plutonic rocks as contrasted with the lavas may reasonably be accounted for by the operation of these gases, which were unable to escape as the deep-seated masses slowly cooled, while they were promptly given up by the superficial effusions. The acid plutonic or intrusive rocks have never been reproduced by laboratory experiments, and the only successful attempts to obtain their minerals artificially have been those in which special provision was made for the retention of the "mineralizing" gases in the crucibles or sealed tubes employed. These gases often do not enter into the composition of the rock-forming minerals, for most of these are free from water, carbonic acid, etc. Hence as crystallization goes on the residual melt must contain an ever-increasing proportion of volatile constituents. It is conceivable that in the final stages the still uncrystallized part of the magma has more resemblance to a solution of mineral matter in superheated steam than to a dry igneous fusion. Quartz, for example, is the last mineral to form in a granite. It bears much of the stamp of the quartz which we know has been deposited from aqueous solution in veins, etc. It is at the same time the most infusible of all the common minerals of rocks. Its late formation shows that in this case it arose at comparatively low temperatures and points clearly to the special importance of the gases of the magma as determining the sequence of crystallization.

When solidification is nearly complete the gases can no longer be retained in the rock and make their escape through fissures towards the surface. They are powerful agents in attacking the minerals of the rocks which they traverse, and instances of their operation are found in the kaolinization of granites, tourmalinization and formation of greisen, deposition of quartz veins, and the group of changes known as propylitization. These "pneumatolytic" processes are of the first importance in the genesis of many ore deposits. They are a real part of the history of the magma itself and constitute the terminal phases of the volcanic sequence.

== Quantifying igneous differentiation ==
There are several methods of directly measuring and quantifying igneous differentiation processes;

- Whole rock geochemistry of representative samples, to track changes and evolution of the magma systems
  - Using the above, calculating normative mineralogy and investigating trends
- Trace element geochemistry
- Isotope geochemistry
  - Investigating the contamination of magma systems by wall rock assimilation using radiogenic isotopes

In all cases, the primary and most valuable method for identifying magma differentiation processes is mapping the exposed rocks, tracking mineralogical changes within the igneous rocks and describing field relationships and textural evidence for magma differentiation. Clinopyroxene thermobarometry can be used to determine pressures and temperatures of magma differentiation.

== See also ==
- Petrology – Study of rocks in geology
- Flow banding – Bands or layers that can sometimes be seen in rock that formed from magma
- Layered intrusion – Large sill-like body of igneous rock
- Cumulate rock – Igneous rock formed by accumulating crystals from a magma
- Rock microstructure – Relationship between materials which compose a rock
- Normative mineralogy – Calculation of the composition of a rock
- Alkaline magma series – Series of alkaline magmas produced by igneous differentiation
- Calc-alkaline magma series – Subdivision of the subalkaline magma series
- Tholeiitic magma series – Series of sub-alkaline magmas
