= Distribution constant =

The distribution constant (or partition ratio) (K_{D}) is the equilibrium constant for the distribution of an analyte in two immiscible solvents.

In chromatography, for a particular solvent, it is equal to the ratio of its molar concentration in the stationary phase to its molar concentration in the mobile phase, also approximating the ratio of the solubility of the solvent in each phase.

The term is often confused with partition coefficient or distribution coefficient.

== Expression ==
The ratio of activities of a solute, A in an aqueous/organic system will remain constant and independent of the total quantity of A (hence $[A]_{org} \propto [A]_{aq}$), so at any given temperature:

$$(K_D)_A = {(aA)_{org} \over(a_A)_{aq}} \approx {[A]_{org} \over[A]_{aq}}$$

Distribution constants are useful as they allow the calculation of the concentration of remaining analyte in the solution, even after a number of solvent extractions have occurred. They also provide guidance in choosing the most efficient way to conduct an extractive separation.

Thus, the concentration of A remaining in an aqueous solution after i extractions with an organic solvent can be found using:

$$[A]_i = \left({V_{aq} \over V_{org} K_D + V_{aq}}\right)^i [A]_0$$

(where [A]_{i} is the concentration of A remaining after extracting V_{aq} millilitres of solution with the original concentration of [A]_{0} with i portions of the organic solvent, each with a volume of V_{org}).
