= Forsterite =

Magnesium end-member of olivine, a nesosilicate mineral

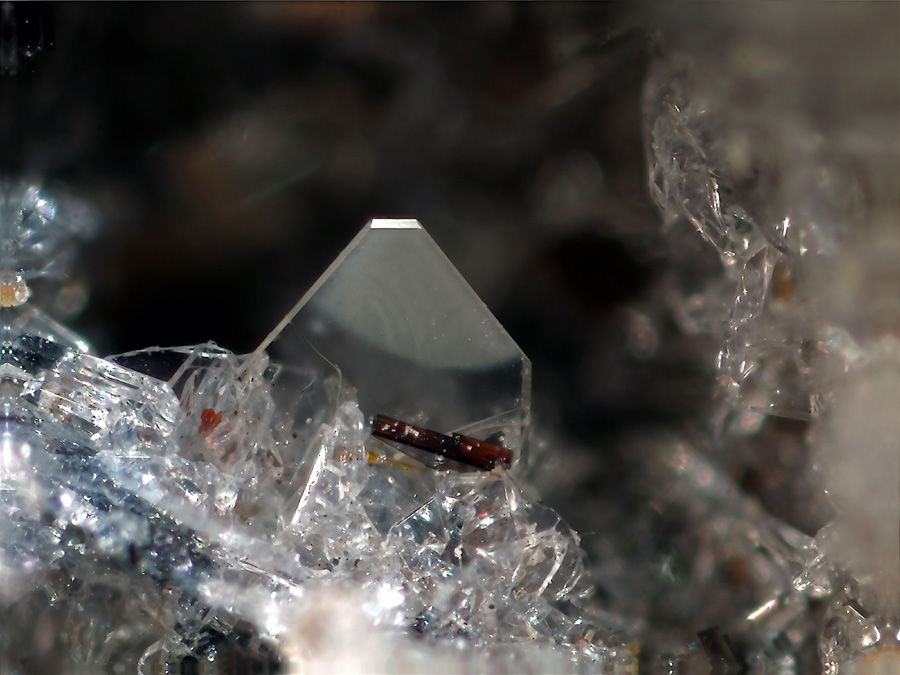
- Forsterite (big tabular and colorless) on sanidine (little colorless crystals) with hematite (reddish)

General
- Category: Nesosilicates
- Formula: Magnesium silicate (Mg_{2}SiO_{4})
- IMA symbol: Fo
- Strunz classification: 9.AC.05
- Crystal system: Orthorhombic
- Crystal class: Dipyramidal (mmm); H–M Symbol: (2/m 2/m 2/m)
- Space group: Pbnm
- Unit cell: a = 4.7540 Å, b = 10.1971 Å c = 5.9806 Å; Z = 4

Identification
- Formula mass: 140.691 g·mol^{−1}
- Color: Colorless, green, yellow, yellow green, white
- Crystal habit: Dipyramidal prisms often tabular, commonly granular or compact massive
- Twinning: On {100}, {011} and {012}
- Cleavage: Perfect on {010} imperfect on {100}
- Fracture: Conchoidal
- Mohs scale hardness: 7
- Luster: Vitreous
- Streak: White
- Diaphaneity: Transparent to translucent
- Specific gravity: 3.21–3.33
- Optical properties: Biaxial (+)
- Refractive index: n_{α} = 1.636–1.730 n_{β} = 1.650–1.739 n_{γ} = 1.669–1.772
- Birefringence: δ = 0.033–0.042
- 2V angle: 82°
- Melting point: 1890 °C

Forsterite (Mg_{2}SiO_{4}; commonly abbreviated as Fo; also known as white olivine) is the magnesium-rich end-member of the olivine solid solution series. It is isomorphous with the iron-rich end-member, fayalite. Forsterite crystallizes in the orthorhombic system (space group Pbnm) with cell parameters a = 4.75 Å (0.475 nm), b = 10.20 Å (1.020 nm) and c = 5.98 Å (0.598 nm).

Forsterite is associated with igneous and metamorphic rocks and has also been found in meteorites. In 2005 it was also found in cometary dust returned by the Stardust probe. In 2011 it was observed as tiny crystals in the dusty clouds of gas around a forming star.

Two polymorphs of forsterite are known: wadsleyite (also orthorhombic) and ringwoodite (isometric, cubic crystal system). Both are mainly known from meteorites.

Peridot is the gemstone variety of forsterite olivine.

== Composition ==
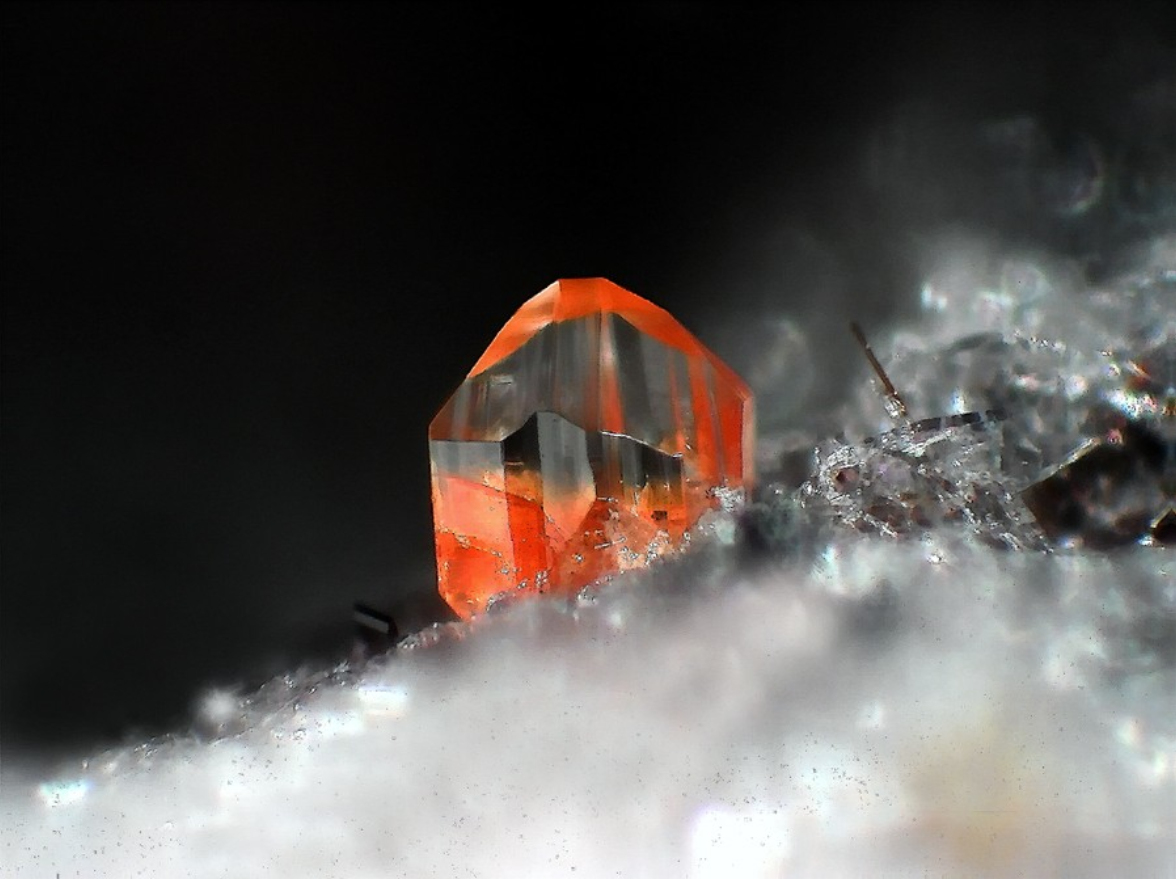
Orange forsterite with a portion of tephroite

Pure forsterite is composed of magnesium, oxygen and silicon. The chemical formula is Mg_{2}SiO_{4}. Forsterite, fayalite (Fe_{2}SiO_{4}) and tephroite (Mn_{2}SiO_{4}) are the end-members of the olivine solid solution series; other elements such as nickel and calcium substitute for iron and magnesium in olivine, but only in minor proportions in natural occurrences. Other minerals such as monticellite (CaMgSiO_{4}), an uncommon calcium-rich mineral, share the olivine structure, but solid solution between olivine and these other minerals is limited. Monticellite is found in contact-metamorphosed dolomites.

== Geologic occurrence ==
Forsterite-rich olivine is the most abundant mineral in the mantle above a depth of about 400 km (250 mi); pyroxenes are also important minerals in this upper part of the mantle. Although pure forsterite does not occur in igneous rocks, dunite often contains olivine with forsterite contents at least as magnesium-rich as Fo_{92} (92% forsterite – 8% fayalite); common peridotite contains olivine typically at least as magnesium-rich as Fo_{88}. Due to its high melting point, olivine crystals are the first minerals to precipitate from a magmatic melt in a cumulate process, often with orthopyroxenes. Forsterite-rich olivine is a common crystallization product of mantle-derived magma. Olivine in mafic and ultramafic rocks typically is rich in the forsterite end-member.

Forsterite also occurs in dolomitic marble which results from the metamorphism of high magnesium limestones and dolomites. Nearly pure forsterite occurs in some metamorphosed serpentinites. Fayalite-rich olivine is much less common. Nearly pure fayalite is a minor constituent in some granite-like rocks, and it is a major constituent of some metamorphic banded iron formations.

== Structure, formation, and physical properties ==
Forsterite is mainly composed of the anion SiO^{4−}_{4} and the cation Mg^{2+} in a molar ratio 1:2. Silicon is the central atom in the SiO^{4−}_{4} anion. Each oxygen atom is bonded to the silicon by a single covalent bond. The four oxygen atoms have a partial negative charge because of the covalent bond with silicon. Therefore, oxygen atoms need to stay far from each other in order to reduce the repulsive force between them. The best geometry to reduce the repulsion is a tetrahedral shape. The cations occupy two different octahedral sites which are M1 and M2 and form ionic bonds with the silicate anions. M1 and M2 are slightly different. The M2 site is larger and more regular than M1 as shown in Fig. 1. The packing in forsterite structure is dense. The space group of this structure is Pbnm and the point group is 2/m 2/m 2/m, which is an orthorhombic crystal structure.

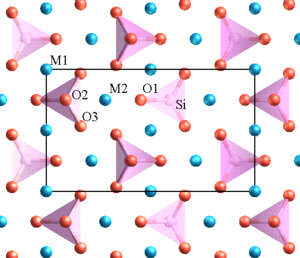
Fig. 1: The atomic scale structure of forsterite looking along the a axis. Oxygen is shown in red, silicon in pink, and Mg in blue. A projection of the unit cell is shown by the black rectangle.

This structure of forsterite can form a complete solid solution by replacing the magnesium with iron. Iron can form two different cations which are Fe^{2+} and Fe^{3+}. The iron(II) ion has the same charge as magnesium ion and it has a very similar ionic radius to magnesium. Consequently, Fe^{2+} can replace the magnesium ion in the olivine structure.

One of the important factors that can increase the portion of forsterite in the olivine solid solution is the ratio of iron(II) ions to iron(III) ions in the magma. As the iron(II) ions oxidize and become iron(III) ions, iron(III) ions cannot form olivine because of their 3+ charge. The occurrence of forsterite due to the oxidation of iron was observed in the Stromboli volcano in Italy. As the volcano fractured, gases and volatiles escaped from the magma chamber. The crystallization temperature of the magma increased as the gases escaped. Because iron(II) ions were oxidized in the Stromboli magma, little iron(II) was available to form iron-rich olivine (fayalite). Hence, the crystallizing olivine was Mg-rich, and igneous rocks rich in forsterite were formed.

Fig. 2: Molar volume vs. pressure at room temperature

At high pressure, forsterite undergoes a phase transition into wadsleyite; under the conditions prevailing in the Earth's upper mantle, this transformation would occur at pressures of around 14–15 GPa. In high-pressure experiments, the transformation may be delayed so that forsterite can remain metastable at pressures up to almost 50 GPa (see Fig. 2).

The progressive metamorphism between dolomite and quartz react to form forsterite, calcite and carbon dioxide:

2 CaMg(CO_{3})_{2} + SiO_{2} → Mg_{2}SiO_{4} + 2 CaCO_{3} + 2 CO_{2}

Forsterite reacts with quartz to form the orthopyroxene mineral enstatite in the following reaction:

Mg_{2}SiO_{4} + SiO_{2} → 2 MgSiO_{3}

== Discovery and name ==
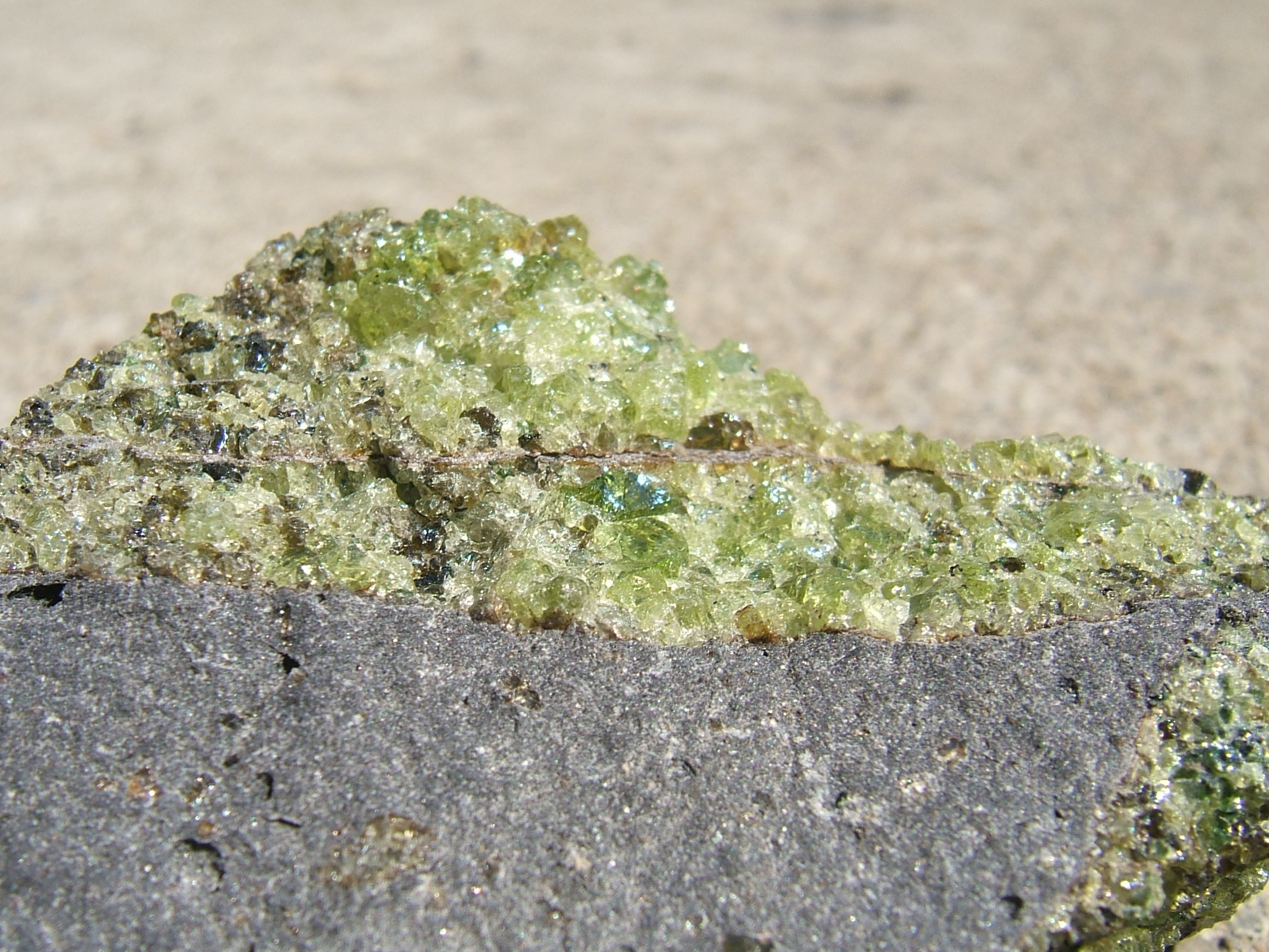
Forsterite var. peridot with minor pyroxene (brown) on vesicular basalt. Collected near Peridot, Arizona.

Forsterite was first described in 1824 for an occurrence at Mount Somma, Vesuvius, Italy. It was named by Armand Lévy in 1824 after the English naturalist and mineral collector Adolarius Jacob Forster.

== Applications ==
Forsterite is being currently studied as a potential biomaterial for implants owing to its superior mechanical properties.
