= Cumulate rock =

Igneous rock formed by accumulating crystals from a magma

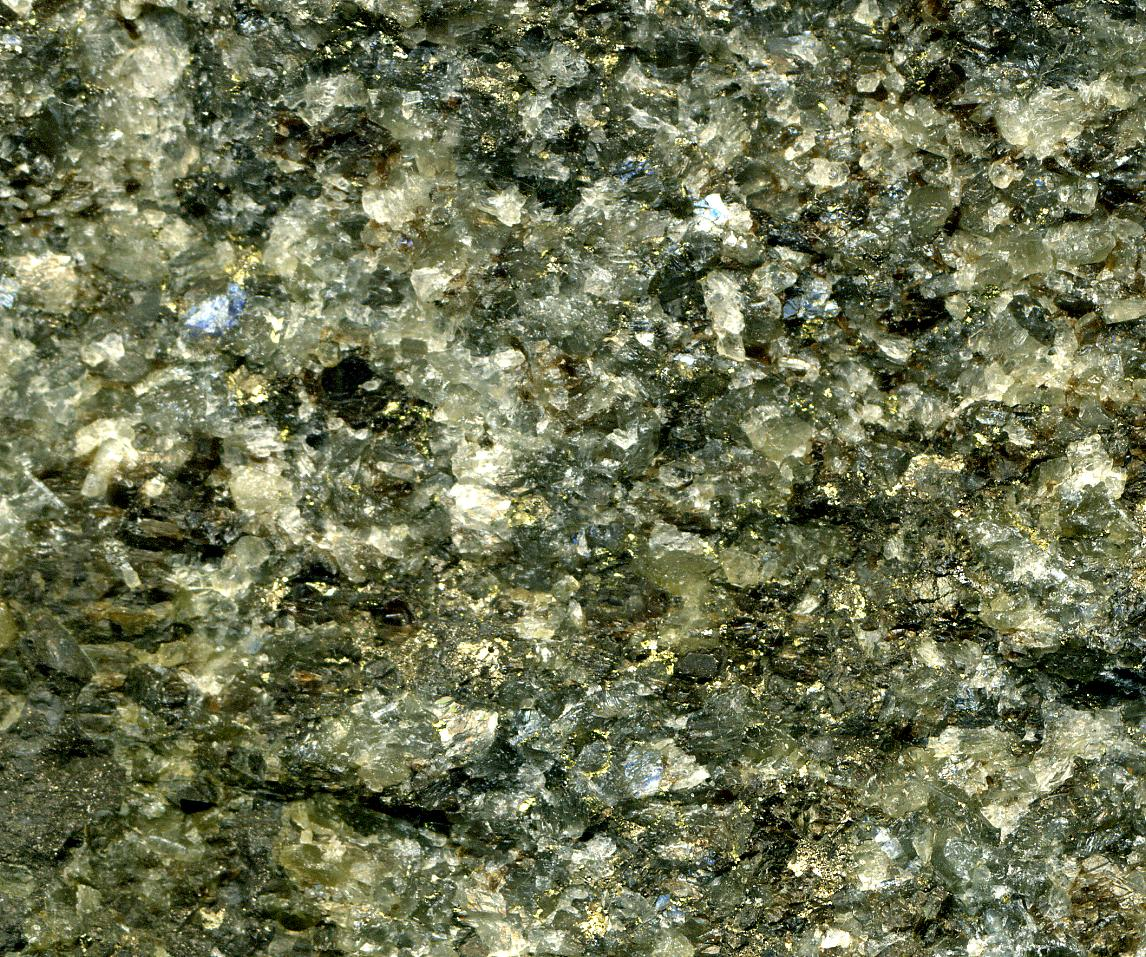
Close-up view of a cumulate rock from Montana (scale: about 45 millimetres (1 3/4 in) across)

Cumulate rocks are igneous rocks formed by the accumulation of crystals from a magma either by settling or floating. Cumulate rocks are named according to their texture; cumulate texture is diagnostic of the conditions of formation of this group of igneous rocks. Cumulates can be deposited on top of other older cumulates of different composition and colour, typically giving the cumulate rock a layered or banded appearance.

== Formation ==
Schematic diagrams showing the principles behind fractional crystallisation in a magma. While cooling, the magma evolves in composition because different minerals crystallize from the melt. 1: olivine crystallizes; 2: olivine and pyroxene crystallize; 3: pyroxene and plagioclase crystallize; 4: plagioclase crystallizes. At the bottom of the magma reservoir, a cumulate rock forms.

Cumulate rocks are the typical product of precipitation of solid crystals from a fractionating magma chamber. These accumulations typically occur on the floor of the magma chamber, although they are possible on the roofs if anorthite plagioclase is able to float free of a denser mafic melt.

Cumulates are typically found in ultramafic intrusions, in the base of large ultramafic lava tubes in komatiite and magnesium rich basalt flows and also in some granitic intrusions.

== Terminology ==
Cumulates are named according to their dominant mineralogy and the percentage of crystals to their groundmass (Hall, 1996).

- Adcumulates are rocks containing ~100–93% accumulated magmatic crystals in a fine-grained groundmass.
- Mesocumulates are rocks with between 93 and 85% accumulated minerals in a groundmass.
- Orthocumulates are rocks containing between 85 and 75% accumulated minerals in groundmass.

Cumulate rocks are typically named according to the cumulate minerals in order of abundance, and then cumulate type (adcumulate, mesocumulate, orthocumulate), and then accessory or minor phases. For example:

- A layer with 50% plagioclase, 40% pyroxene, 5% olivine and 5% groundmass (in essence a gabbro) would be termed a plagioclase-pyroxene adcumulate with accessory olivine.
- A rock consisting of 80% olivine, 5% magnetite and 15% groundmass is an olivine mesocumulate, (in essence a peridotite).

Cumulate terminology is appropriate for use when describing cumulate rocks. In intrusions which have a uniform composition and minimal textural and mineralogical layering or visible crystal accumulations it is inappropriate to describe them according to this convention.

== Geochemistry ==
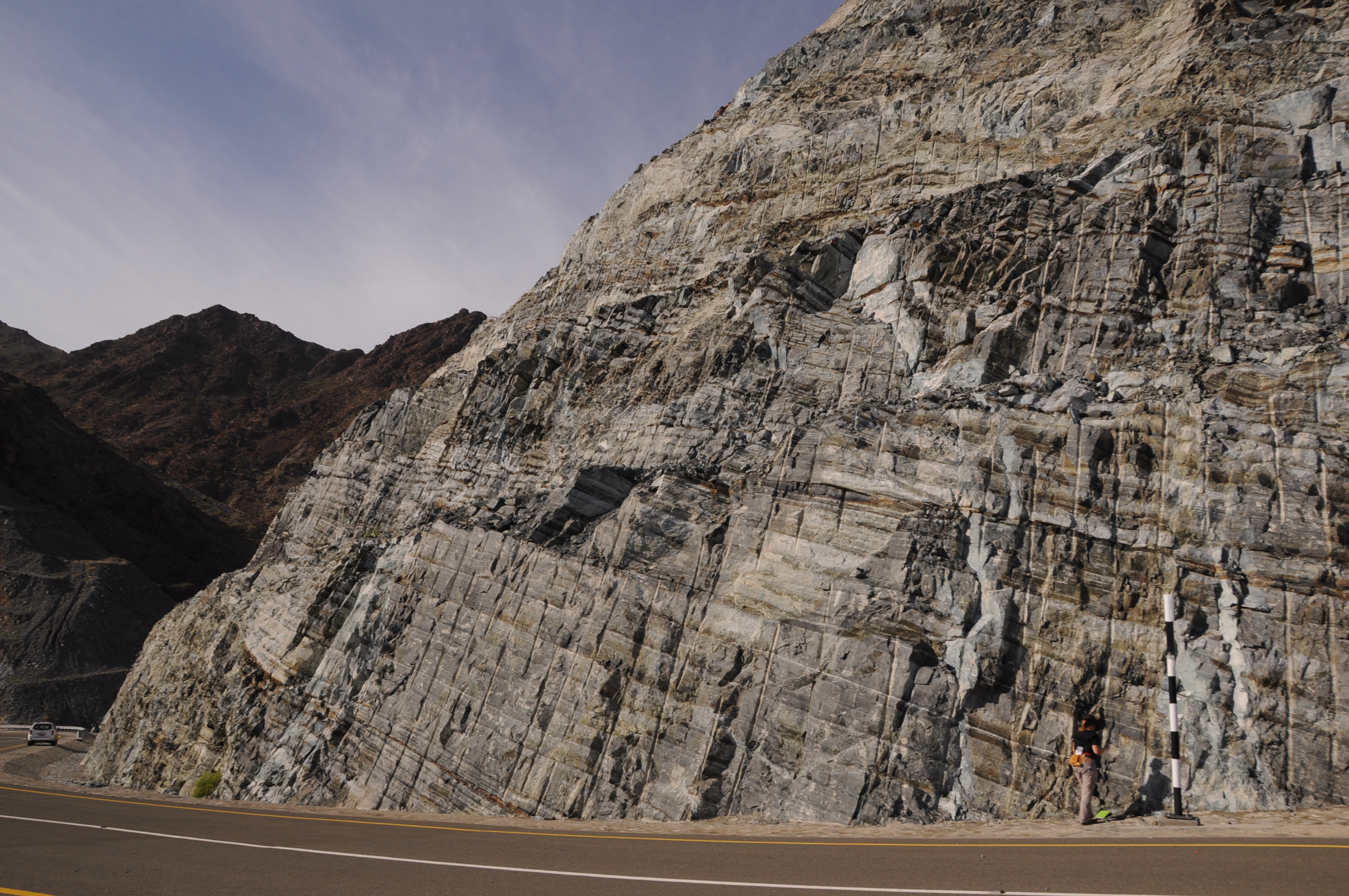
Layers of cumulate rock (gabbro) in Oman

Cumulate rocks, because they are fractionates of a parental magma, should not be used to infer the composition of a magma from which they are formed. The chemistry of the cumulate itself can inform on the residual melt composition, but several factors need to be considered.

=== Chemistry ===
The chemistry of a cumulate can inform upon the temperature, pressure and chemistry of the melt from which it was formed, but the number of minerals which co-precipitate need to be known, as does the chemistry or mineral species of the precipitated minerals. This is best illustrated by an example;

As an example, a magma of basalt composition that is precipitating cumulates of anorthite plagioclase plus enstatite pyroxene is changing composition by the removal of the elements which make up the precipitated minerals. In this example, the precipitation of anorthite (a calcium aluminium feldspar) removes calcium from the melt, which becomes more depleted in calcium. Enstatite being precipitated from the melt will remove magnesium, so the melt becomes depleted in these elements. This tends to enrich the concentration of other elements - typically sodium, potassium, titanium and iron.

The rock that is made of the accumulated minerals will not have the same composition as the magma. In the above example, the cumulate of anorthite + enstatite is rich in calcium and magnesium, and the melt is depleted in calcium and magnesium. The cumulate rock is a plagioclase-pyroxene cumulate (a gabbro) and the melt is now more felsic and aluminous in composition (trending towards andesite compositions).

In the above example, the plagioclase and pyroxene need not be pure end-member compositions (anorthite-enstatite), and thus the effect of depletion of elements can be complex. The minerals can be precipitated in any ratio within the cumulate; such cumulates can be 90% plagioclase:10% enstatite, through to 10% plagiclase:90% enstatite and remain a gabbro. This also alters the chemistry of the cumulate, and the depletions of the residual melt.

It can be seen that the effect on the composition of the residual melt left behind by the formation of the cumulate is dependent on the composition of the minerals which precipitate, the number of minerals which co-precipitate at the same time, and the ratio of the minerals which co-precipitate. In nature, cumulates usually form from 2 mineral species, although ranges from 1 to 4 mineral species are known. Cumulate rocks which are formed from one mineral alone are often named after the mineral, for example a 99% magnetite cumulate is known as a magnetitite.

A specific example is the Skaergaard intrusion in Greenland. At Skaergaard a 2500 m thick layered intrusion shows distinct chemical and mineralogic layering:

- Plagioclase varies from An_{66} near the base to An_{30} near the top (An_{xx} = anorthite percentage)
  - CaO 10.5% base to 5.1% top; Na_{2}O + K_{2}O 2.3% base to 5.9% top
- Olivine varies from Fo_{57} near the base to Fo_{0} at the top (Fo_{xx} = forsterite percentage of the olivine)
  - MgO 11.6% base to 1.7% top; FeO 9.3% base to 22.7% top

The Skaergaard is interpreted to have crystallised from a single confined magma chamber.

=== Residual melt chemistry ===
One way to infer the composition of the magma that created the cumulate rocks is to measure groundmass chemistry, but that chemistry is problematic or impossible to sample. Otherwise, complex calculations of averaging cumulate layers must be utilised, which is a complex process. Alternatively, the magma composition can be estimated by assuming certain conditions of magma chemistry and testing them on phase diagrams using measured mineral chemistry. These methods work fairly well for cumulates formed in volcanic conditions (i.e.; komatiites). Investigating magma conditions of large layered ultramafic intrusions is more fraught with problems.

These methods have their drawbacks, primarily that they must all make certain assumptions which rarely hold true in nature. The foremost problem is that in large ultramafic intrusions, assimilation of wall rocks tends to alter the chemistry of the melt as time progresses, so measuring groundmass compositions may fall short. Mass balance calculations will show deviations from expected ranges, which may infer assimilation has occurred, but then further chemistry must be embarked upon to quantify these findings.

Secondly, large ultramafic intrusions are rarely sealed systems and may be subject to regular injections of fresh, primitive magma, or to loss of volume due to further upward migration of the magma (possibly to feed volcanic vents or dyke swarms). In such cases, calculating magma chemistries may resolve nothing more than the presence of these two processes having affected the intrusion.

Though crystallized at high temperature, cumulate can remelt when later intruded by a sill or dyke of magma.

== Economic importance ==
The economic importance of cumulate rocks is best represented by three classes of mineral deposits found in ultramafic to mafic layered intrusions.

- Silicate mineral cumulates
- Oxide mineral cumulates
- Sulfide melt cumulates

=== Silicate mineral cumulates ===
Silicate minerals are rarely sufficiently valuable to warrant extraction as ore. However, some anorthosite intrusions contain such pure anorthite concentrations that they are mined for feldspar, for use in refractories, glassmaking, semiconductors and other sundry uses (toothpaste, cosmetics, etc.).

=== Oxide mineral cumulates ===
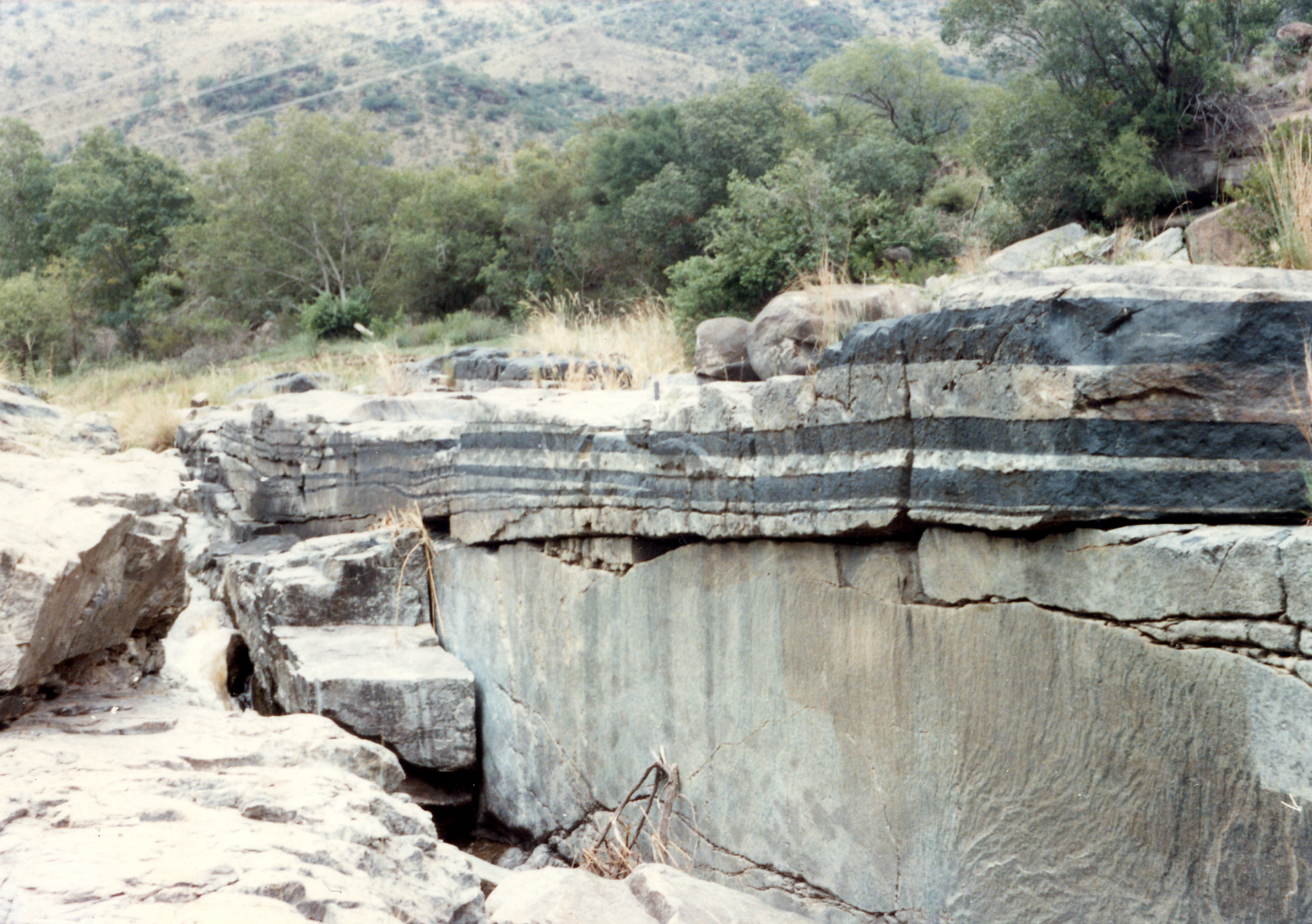
Dark layers of chromite-rich cumulate rock (chromitite) alternating with light layers of plagioclase-rich rock in the Bushveld Igneous Complex, South Africa

Oxide mineral cumulates form in layered intrusions when fractional crystallisation has progressed enough to allow the crystallisation of oxide minerals which are invariably a form of spinel. This can happen due to fractional enrichment of the melt in iron, titanium or chromium.

These conditions are created by the high-temperature fractionation of highly magnesian olivine or pyroxene, which causes a relative iron-enrichment in the residual melt. When the iron content of the melt is sufficiently high, magnetite or ilmenite crystallise and, due to their high density, form cumulate rocks. Chromite is generally formed during pyroxene fractionation at low pressures, where chromium is rejected from the pyroxene crystals.

These oxide layers form laterally continuous deposits of rocks containing in excess of 50% oxide minerals. When oxide minerals exceed 90% of the bulk of the interval the rock may be classified according to the oxide mineral, for example magnetitite, ilmenitite or chromitite. Strictly speaking, these would be magnetite orthocumulate, ilmenite orthocumulate and chromite orthocumulates.

=== Sulfide mineral segregations ===
Sulfide mineral cumulates in layered intrusions are an important source of nickel, copper, platinum group elements and cobalt. Deposits of a mixed massive or mixed sulfide-silicate 'matrix' of pentlandite, chalcopyrite, pyrrhotite and/or pyrite are formed, occasionally with cobaltite and platinum-tellurium sulfides. These deposits are formed by melt immiscibility between sulfide and silicate melts in a sulfur-saturated magma.

They are not strictly a cumulate rock, as the sulfide is not precipitated as a solid mineral, but rather as immiscible sulfide liquid. However, they are formed by the same processes and accumulate due to their high specific gravity, and can form laterally extensive sulfide 'reefs'. The sulfide minerals generally form an interstitial matrix to a silicate cumulate.

Sulfide mineral segregations can only be formed when a magma attains sulfur saturation. In mafic and ultramafic rocks they form economic nickel, copper and platinum group (PGE) deposits because these elements are chalcophile and are strongly partitioned into the sulfide melt. In rare cases, felsic rocks become sulfur saturated and form sulfide segregations. In this case, the typical result is a disseminated form of sulfide mineral, usually a mixture of pyrrhotite, pyrite and chalcopyrite, forming copper mineralisation. It is very rare but not unknown to see cumulate sulfide rocks in granitic intrusions.

== See also ==
- Igneous differentiation
- Igneous rocks
- Komatiite
- Layered intrusion
- List of rock textures
- Ultramafic rocks

== Sources ==
- Blatt, Harvey and Robert J. Tracy, 1996, Petrology: Igneous, Sedimentary and Metamorphic, 2nd ed., pp. 123–132 & 194–197, Freeman, ISBN 0-7167-2438-3
- Ballhaus, C.G. & Glikson, A.Y., 1995, Petrology of layered mafic-ultramafic intrusions of the Giles Complex, western Musgrave Block, central Australia. AGSO Journal, 16/1&2: 69–90.
