= Liquidus and solidus =

Melting points of chemical mixtures

While chemically pure materials have a single melting point, chemical mixtures often partially melt at the temperature known as the solidus (T_{S} or T_{sol}), and fully melt at the higher liquidus temperature (T_{L} or T_{liq}). The solidus is always less than or equal to the liquidus, but they need not coincide. If a gap exists between the solidus and liquidus it is called the freezing range, and within that gap, the substance consists of a mixture of solid and liquid phases (like a slurry). Such is the case, for example, with the olivine (forsterite-fayalite) system, which is common in Earth's mantle.

== Definitions ==
The equilibrium phase diagram of a solid solution of made up of mixtures of α and β. The upper curve is the line of liquidus, and the lower curve is the line of solidus.

In chemistry, materials science, and physics, the liquidus temperature specifies the temperature above which a material is completely liquid, and the maximum temperature at which crystals can co-exist with the melt in thermodynamic equilibrium. The solidus is the locus of temperatures (a curve on a phase diagram) below which a given substance is completely solid (crystallized). The solidus temperature specifies the temperature below which a material is completely solid, and the minimum temperature at which a melt can co-exist with crystals in thermodynamic equilibrium.

Liquidus and solidus are mostly used for impure substances (mixtures) such as glasses, metal alloys, ceramics, rocks, and minerals. Lines of liquidus and solidus appear in the phase diagrams of binary solid solutions, as well as in eutectic systems away from the invariant point.

=== When distinction is irrelevant ===
For pure elements or compounds, e.g. pure copper, pure water, etc. the liquidus and solidus are at the same temperature, and the term melting point may be used.

There are also some mixtures which melt at a particular temperature, known as congruent melting. One example is eutectic mixture. In a eutectic system, there is particular mixing ratio where the solidus and liquidus temperatures coincide at a point known as the invariant point. At the invariant point, the mixture undergoes a eutectic reaction where both solids melt at the same temperature.

== Modeling and measurement ==
There are several models used to predict liquidus and solidus curves for various systems.

Detailed measurements of solidus and liquidus can be made using techniques such as differential scanning calorimetry and differential thermal analysis.

== Effects ==
Liquidus temperature curve in the binary glass system SiO_{2}-Li_{2}O

For impure substances, e.g. alloys, honey, soft drink, ice cream, etc. the melting point broadens into a melting interval. If the temperature is within the melting interval, one may see "slurries" at equilibrium, i.e. the slurry will neither fully solidify nor melt. This is why new snow of high purity on mountain peaks either melts or stays solid, while dirty snow on the ground in cities tends to become slushy at certain temperatures. Weld melt pools containing high levels of sulfur, either from melted impurities of the base metal or from the welding electrode, typically have very broad melting intervals, which leads to increased risk of hot cracking.

=== Behavior when cooling ===
Above the liquidus temperature, the material is homogeneous and liquid at equilibrium. As the system is cooled below the liquidus temperature, more and more crystals will form in the melt if one waits a sufficiently long time, depending on the material. Alternately, homogeneous glasses can be obtained through sufficiently fast cooling, i.e., through kinetic inhibition of the crystallization process.

The crystal phase that crystallizes first on cooling a substance to its liquidus temperature is termed primary crystalline phase or primary phase. The composition range within which the primary phase remains constant is known as primary crystalline phase field.

The liquidus temperature is important in the glass industry because crystallization can cause severe problems during the glass melting and forming processes, and it also may lead to product failure.

== See also ==
- Melting/freezing point
- Phase diagram
- Solvus
