= Impala Platinum =

Multinational mining corporation based in South Africa

Impala Platinum Holdings Limited
- Type: Public
- Traded as: JSE: IMP LSE: 0S2J
- Industry: Platinum
- Founded: 1966
- Headquarters: Johannesburg, South Africa
- Key people: Thandi Orleyn (Chair); Nico Muller (CEO)
- Revenue: R85.4 billion (2025) ZAR
- Number of employees: 63,000 (2026)
- Website: www.implats.co.za

Impala Platinum Holdings Limited or Implats is a South African holding company that owns several companies which operate mines that produce platinum and platinum group metals, as well as nickel, copper and cobalt. Its most significant mine is the Impala mine in the North West province of South Africa. The company also owns or has interest in the Two Rivers mine and the Marula mine in the South Africa Bushveld Igneous Complex and the Mimosa mine and Zimplats in Zimbabwe, as well as the Impala Refining Services which smelts and refines metals for other companies. In December 2019, Impala Canada was formed, owned by the holding company, out of the acquisition of North American Palladium and its mine in Ontario, Canada.

== History ==
Implats was formed in 1966 as a subsidiary of Union Corporation, which established a platinum mine in Rustenburg with an initial capacity of 100,000 oz per year. It received technical advice from Canadian company Inco, while British bank Hambros provided financial advice. The two, along with South African state-owned Industrial Development Corporation, each took a 10% share in the company. In 1968, Implats entered into a prospecting accord with the Bafokeng tribe (now the Royal Bafokeng Nation) and obtained a lease for 12,000 ha of land, with production kicking off in July 1969.

During the 1970s, legislation introducing new vehicle emission standards worldwide, including those introduced and pursued in the U.S. by the Environmental Protection Agency (EPA), increased global demand for platinum. In 1974, Implats began supplying major motor manufacturer General Motors with up to 300,000 t oz of platinum and 120,000 t oz of palladium a year for devices to reduce exhaust pollution.

On 26 January 1973, Bishopsgate Platinum Limited, of which Implats was a wholly owned subsidiary, was listed on the Johannesburg Stock Exchange (JSE). On 19 October 1978, Bishopsgate changed its name to Impala Platinum Holdings Limited (Implats).

In 1990, Implats acquired an effective interest in Western Platinum and Eastern Platinum (collectively Lonhro Platinum Division, or Lonplats). A full merger agreement with Lonplats was attained in 1995, but was subsequently blocked by the European Union in 1996.

Between 2000 and 2004, Implats gained mineral rights to establish Marula Platinum and also acquired strategic stakes in Zimbabwean operations Zimbabwe Platinum (Zimplats) and Mimosa Mining Company. It entered into a joint venture with Anglovaal Mining (Avmin) to develop the Two Rivers Platinum project, and sold its stakes in Barplats Mines and Lonplats.

In 2003, Implats' parent company Gencor completed its "unbundling" after having amalgamated with Gold Fields in 1998. Shareholders were given 8.8 Implats shares for every 100 Gencor shares they held.

In March 2011, the government of Zimbabwe implemented laws which required local ownership of mining companies. Following this news, there were falls in the share prices of companies with mines in Zimbabwe, including Implats.

In late January 2014, thousands of employees belonging to Impala Platinum and other platinum mines in South Africa went on strike, demanding a basic salary of R 12,500 (1,180$).

The strike, the longest in the history of South Africa, ended in late June 2014 when the Association of Mineworkers and Construction Union (AMCU) signed a three-year settlement deal with Impala Platinum and other platinum mine owners, which saw workers earning less than R 12,500 get a wage increase of R 1,000 ($95) per month for two years and R 950 ($90) per month in the third year.

In October 2019, Implats announced it would acquire the outstanding shares in Canadian-based North American Palladium Limited for $758 million.

North American Palladium Ltd. was purchased by Johannesburg-based Impala Platinum Holdings Limited for CA$1 billion in 2019. Under the terms of the deal, Brookfield Business Partners was paid $570 million for its 81% stake in the company and minority shareholders were paid $19.74 per share. From that point on, the Lac des Iles mine would be operated by the new company called Impala Canada Limited.

== Management ==
Since August 2018, Impala Platinum has been led by company directors Nico Muller (CEO) and Meroonisha Kerber (CFO). Kerber joined the company in August 2018 after her predecessor Brenda Berlin, who had served as CFO since 2011, resigned in February.

== Safety incidents ==
In 2007, two Implats employees were killed in a blast at the Clapham Shaft.

In 2009, nine Implats employees were killed in a fall-of-ground incident at the Impala 14 Shaft at its Rustenburg mine.

In 2012, Implats was charged with culpable homicide over the death of one of its workers five years prior. The charge was based on the report of a mining inspector, who claimed that mine bosses had not taken proper measures to ensure that the worker was safe when he was sent to install support bars under the overhang that collapsed on him.

In 2016, four Implats employees were killed in a fire at the Rustenburg mine. Rescue teams were present, but the four had been overcome by smoke and never managed to escape.

In 2020, the CEO of Impala Rustenburg, Mark Munroe was arrested for recalling employees too early, in violation of South Africa's COVID-19 lockdown restrictions. Munroe was later released on bail, and the charges against him were eventually dropped. For his decision to reopen the mines, Minister of Mineral Resources and Energy, Gwede Mantashe became the target of the National Union of Mineworkers.

In 2021, three Implats employees were killed in a mud-rush at the Impala Rustenburg 6 Shaft, and two were hospitalized.

In November 2023, 11 employees lost their lives in the Impala Platinum mine shaft accident when a cage carrying miners fell 200m down the shaft. Seventy-five were injured.

== Union related violence ==
In 2012, what started as a peaceful protest resulted in a massacre. The Marikana massacre was the killing of thirty-four miners by the South African Police Service (SAPS) on 16 August 2012, during a wildcat strike at the Lonmin platinum mine in Marikana, Rustenburg, North West province, South Africa. The violence started because of a history of antagonism and violence between the African National Congress-allied National Union of Mineworkers (NUM) and its emerging rival, the Association of Mineworkers and Construction Union (AMCU). At the Marikana platinum mine, operated by Lonmin at Nkaneng near Rustenburg, 3,000 workers walked off the job on 10 August after Lonmin failed to meet with workers. On 11 August, NUM leaders allegedly opened fire on striking NUM members who were marching to their offices. The killing of two miners was reported in the South African media as a central reason for the breakdown in trust within the union amongst workers. Despite earlier contradictory reports, the clashes on the 11th are now acknowledged to be the first incidents of violence during the strike.

According to the Bench Marks Foundation, the violence erupted against a backdrop of a lack of employment opportunities for local youth, squalid living conditions, unemployment and growing inequalities. It claimed the workers were exploited and this was a motivation for the violence. It also criticised the high profits when compared with the low wages of the workers.

Impala Platinum declared the strike "illegal" and fired 13.000 workers that had participated, almost half of 30.000 employed in the town.

In 2014, a five-month-long platinum strike had resulted in the deaths of four people, six stabbings, and 24 billion rands ($2.25 billion) in lost revenue for the South African platinum industry. The GDP of South Africa contracted in the first quarter of 2014, pulled down by the steepest drop in mining production (25% of which 19% was directly attributable to the strike) in 50 years. It was the first contraction since 2009. Workers, most of whom already lived in poverty, lost around 11 billion rands ($1 billion) in wages.

In 2017, an AMCU treasurer was shot and killed outside an Implats platinum mine in Rustenburg.
