= Braggite =

Sulfide mineral

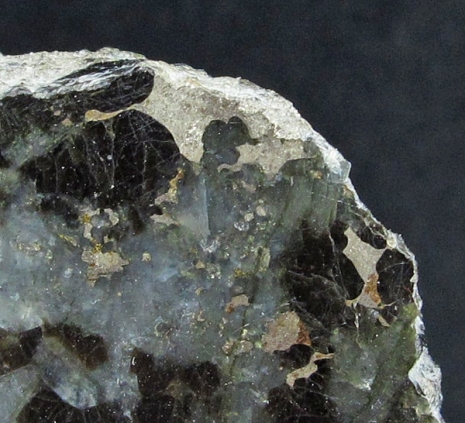
- Braggite

General
- Category: Sulfide mineral
- Formula: (Pt,Pd,Ni)S
- IMA symbol: Bg
- Strunz classification: 2.CC.35a
- Dana classification: 2.8.5.3
- Crystal system: Tetragonal
- Crystal class: Dipyramidal (4/m); H-M symbol: (4/m)
- Space group: P4_{2}/m
- Unit cell: a = 6.367 Å, c = 6.561 Å; Z = 8

Identification
- Color: Steel grey; white in reflected light
- Crystal habit: Prismatic crystals and rounded grains
- Twinning: Rarely observed
- Cleavage: None
- Mohs scale hardness: 1.5
- Luster: Metallic
- Diaphaneity: opaque
- Specific gravity: 10 (measured) 9.383 (calculated)
- Optical properties: Anisotropism distinct in polished section

Braggite is a sulfide mineral of platinum, palladium and nickel with chemical formula: (Pt, Pd, Ni)S. It is a dense (specific gravity of 10), steel grey, opaque mineral which crystallizes in the tetragonal crystal system. It is the central member in the platinum group end-members cooperite and vysotskite.

It was first described in 1932 for an occurrence in the Bushveld Igneous Complex of South Africa. Its name came from William Henry Bragg (1862–1942) and his son, William Lawrence Bragg (1890–1971). It was the first mineral that was discovered with the assistance of X rays.

It occurs as magmatic segregations in layered igneous intrusions such as Bushveld, the Stillwater igneous complex, the Lac des Îles igneous complex, the island of Rùm intrusive, the Great Dyke and many others. It is one of the most common platinum group minerals.

== Composition ==
The braggite composition series is between the platinum rich cooperite and palladium rich vysotskite end members in solid solution and is thus considered of primary economic importance as an ore for both of these precious metals. Braggite, as well as vysotskite, was named prior to knowledge of phase relations in the Pt-Pd-S System and prior to the extensive microprobe analyses now available. Using electron probe analyses the average proportions for metal in the sulfide structure were determined to be 64 percent Pt, 27 percent Pd, and 14 percent Ni. When based on the unit cell content, this approximates to Pt_{5}Pd_{2}NiS_{8}.

== Geologic occurrence ==
Platinum group minerals occur many places throughout the world in layered mafic and ultramafic intrusions formed at high magmatic temperatures, such as the Great Merensky Reef deposits of the Bushveld Igneous Complex in Transvaal Province, South Africa and the Precambrian Stillwater Complex in Montana. Braggite has also been found as euhedral grains in platinum-iron nuggets from alluvial deposits in remote regions of eastern Madagascar. The possible sources for these nuggets can be traced to ultramafic facies composed primarily of pyroxenites, peridotite and serpentine, and tremolite and soapstone. In solution, cooperite forms the first solid at just above the 1100 °C threshold, braggite at around 1000 °C, and lastly vysotskite at temperatures below 900 °C. The amount of braggite varies in any given PGM complex. It averages 35.9 volume percent in the Western Transvaal while the Atok Platinum mine in Bushveld boasts 60 volume percent.

== Atomic structure ==
Braggite is a tetragonal mineral with lattice spacing a = 6.38, c = 6.57 Å, Z = 8 and angles between axes α = β = γ = 90° with space group symmetry P4_{1}/m. Ionic bonds form between X and Z sites, but braggite also tends to exhibit metallic bonding characteristics. The general sulfide structure is X_{m}Z_{n}, where X represents the metallic elements and Z the nonmetallic element. In the braggite structure, the Z site is always filled by sulfur with a charge of 2^{−}. Due to distortions in the structure the X site can vary in size and is filled by Pd, Pt, or Ni each having a 2^{+} charge.

== Physical properties ==
Braggite appears steel grey to silvery white to the naked eye. When viewed through a petrographic microscope, under plane polarized light, braggite is white and slightly bireflectant and lacks reflectance pleochroism. Observing between crossed polars, its anisotropy is distinct in air and is characterized by a purplish-grey to brown-grey tint. Relatively large crystals (up to 8 mm long) are not unusual for braggite and fracturing is common. Braggite has a measured specific gravity of 10 and calculated specific gravity of 9.383. Twinning is rarely observed. Braggite was found to have microindentation VHN values ranging from 973–1015.

== Discovery and naming ==
Bannister and Hey discovered and named braggite in 1932. It is the first mineral to be discovered by X-ray methods alone, and thus it was named to honour Sir William Henry Bragg and Sir William Lawrence Bragg of Cambridge University; both were pioneers in the x-ray investigation of crystals.
