= Palladium coin =

Bullion coin made of palladium metal

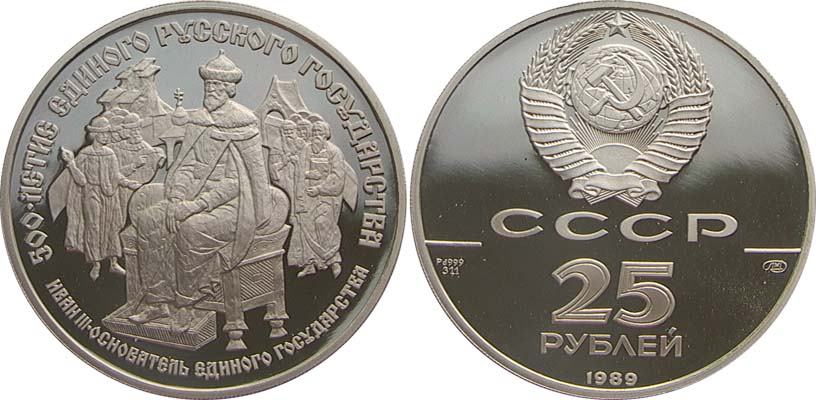
Soviet-era Palladium coin

Palladium coins are a form of coinage made out of the rare silver-white transition metal palladium. Palladium is assigned the code XPD by ISO 4217. The first palladium coins were produced in 1966.

== History ==
Sierra Leone issued the first palladium coins in 1966. Tonga commenced issuing palladium coins a year later, in 1967, and those issues included the Tonga Palladium Hau. Since then a number of countries have issued palladium coins, including Canada, the Soviet Union, France, Palau, Portugal, Russia, China, Australia and Slovakia. Most of these have been special commemorative coins.

The former USSR, now the Russian Federation, minted the most palladium coins in the world. Some other popular palladium coins minted by other countries are listed below.

== American Palladium Eagle ==
A bill authorizing the United States Mint to produce and distribute a one-troy-ounce palladium coin was passed into law on December 14, 2010. The American Palladium Eagle, with a face value of $25, was first issued in 2017.

== Canadian Big & Little Bear Constellations and Palladium Maple Leaf ==
The Canadian Big & Little Bear Constellations are the lowest-mintage coins ever minted by the Royal Canadian Mint, totaling no more than 1200 coins. There are four versions corresponding to four seasons. Actual mintages are 297 springs, 296 summers, 296 autumns, and 293 winters.

The Royal Canadian Mint minted palladium maple leafs from 2005 to 2007, in 2009, and resumed minting in 2015. These coins are made of 99.95% pure palladium (.9995 quality), each one containing one troy ounce of pure palladium. They are legal tender in Canada. One of the sides bears a single maple leaf (one of the national symbols of Canada), and the other has the effigy of Queen Elizabeth II.

== See also ==
- Bullion
- Bullion coin
- Gold coin
- Inflation hedge
- Palladium as an investment
- Platinum coin
- Precious metal
- Silver coin
