= Northam Platinum =

South African PGM producer

Northam Platinum Holdings Limited
- Type: Public
- Traded as: JSE: NPH
- Industry: Mining
- Founded: 1977; 49 years ago
- Headquarters: Johannesburg, South Africa
- Area served: Worldwide
- Key people: Mcebisi Jonas (Chairman); Paul Dunne (CEO)
- Products: Platinum group metals
- Revenue: R32.901 billion (2025)
- Operating income: R3.593 billion (2025)
- Net income: R1.487 billion (2025)
- Total assets: R58.076 billion (2025)
- Total equity: R32.145 billion (2025)
- Number of employees: 23,783 (2025)
- Website: northam.co.za

Northam Holdings is a South African platinum group metal producer, headquartered in Johannesburg. Founded in 1977, the company is listed on the JSE.

Northam's primary operations are centered on three wholly-owned mines - Zondereinde, Booysendal, and Eland, and additional metallurgical operations at Zondereinde, which includes a smelter and base metals removal plant.

The company's three main mined products are platinum, palladium, and rhodium. The raw materials are consumed by various industrial sectors, including automotive manufacturing, and jewelry.

== Operations ==
Northam Platinum has three main mines in South Africa located at Zondereinde in Limpopo, Booysendal in Mpumalanga, and Eland in the North West. Located close to Thabazimbi, the Zondereinde mine produces 280,000oz of refined PGMs a year in 2016 and has an expected life of more than 20 years. Close by is Northam Chrome, which obtains chrome from the material mined from Zondereinde.

The Booysendal site consists of three mines, Booysendal UG2 North, Booysendal Merensky North and Booysendal South. UG2 North opened in July 2013 and produces 160,000oz a year with a 105 million ounces available.

Merensky North is under development and the South mine also consists of the Everest platinum mine purchased from Aquarius Platinum in 2015.

In a joint venture project, it has a 7.5% interest the Pandora mine with Anglo American Platinum and Lonmin. Northam also has a 50% interest in the Dwaalkop joint venture and a 51% interest in the Kokerboom exploration joint in the Northern Cape.

During February 2017, Northam announced a proposal to purchase the Eland platinum mine for R135 million from its owner Glencore.

The mine, said to have 21.3 million ounces of product, had been closed since 2015, due to price falls and difficulties in its operations. The purchase includes the mines two mining rights, surface and underground infrastructure. Northam had also reached marketing deal for the sale of its chrome product through Glencore.

== Ownership ==
As of June 2026, Northam's shareholders are as follows:

Northam Platinum
Rank	Name of owner	Percentage ownership
1	Public Investment Corporation	20.93
2	Coronation Asset Management	10.47
3	Ninety One Limited	6.9
4	Royal Bafokeng Investment Holding Company Proprietary Limited	5.31
5	Other investors and via the JSE	56.39
	Total	100.00
