= Sibanye-Stillwater =

Largest individual producer of gold from South Africa

- Type: Public
- Traded as: JSE: SSW; NYSE: SBSW
- Industry: Mining
- Founded: November 2012
- Headquarters: Johannesburg, South Africa
- Area served: South Africa
- Key people: Richard Stewart (CEO); Vincent Maphai (Chairman)
- Products: Platinum; Palladium; Rhodium; Gold
- Number of employees: 72,668 (2025)
- Subsidiaries: Keliber
- Website: sibanyestillwater.com

Sibanye-Stillwater is a global mining and metals processing group with a portfolio of mining and processing operations and projects and investments across five continents. The Group is also one of the global recyclers of a suite of metals and has interests in secondary mining operations.

Sibanye-Stillwater is one of the world's largest producers and refiners of platinum group metals (PGMs: platinum, palladium, rhodium, iridium and ruthenium) and is also a top-tier gold producer. It also produces nickel, chrome, copper, silver, cobalt and zinc. The Group has also diversified mining and processing battery metals and has increased its presence in the circular economy by expanding its recycling and secondary-mining exposure globally.

== History ==
In 2012, Gold Fields Limited unbundled its subsidiary, GFI Mining South Africa Proprietary Limited ("GFIMSA"), which was then renamed Sibanye Gold Limited ("Sibanye Gold"), and consisted of the Kloof, Driefontein and Beatrix mines, as well as an array of support service entities in South Africa. "Gold Fields stockholders were given one share in Sibanye for each of their Gold Fields shares." The three South African mines transferred from Gold Fields to Sibanye are:

- Beatrix gold mine
- KDC mine (formerly Kloof)
- Driefontein mine

The company immediately embarked upon a strategic growth plan which saw the 2013 acquisition of the Cooke operations from Gold One as well as the WitsGold acquisition (Burnstone project) of 2014.

In April 2016 the company entered the PGM space, with an all-share offer for Aquarius Platinum. (comprising Kroondal, Platinum Mile, a 50% shareholding in Zimbabwe's Mimosa mine and a number of exploration projects), as well as the acquisition of the Rustenburg operations from Anglo American Platinum Limited.

On 30 August 2017, following the successful purchase of the Stillwater Mining Company in Montana, Sibanye Gold Limited began trading as Sibanye-Stillwater and reorganized its operations by region – Southern Africa and the United States.

In June 2019, Sibanye-Stillwater acquired Lonmin Plc, London, UK, a top tier PGM producer. The enlarged group is the world's largest primary producer of platinum and rhodium, one of the largest producer of palladium and the leading recycler and processor of spent PGM catalytic converter materials.

In January 2020, Sibanye-Stillwater increased its holding in DRDGOLD to 50.10%.

February 2021 saw the Group enter the battery metals industry with an investment into and partnership with Keliber, a leading European Lithium project based in Finland. Keliber has been a subsidiary of Sibanye-Stillwater since 2022, which owns 80% of the shares.

According to their 2025 annual report, the Group produced 1.7 million 4E ounces (platinum, palladium, rhodium and gold) from its SA PGM operations and 284 thousand 2E ounces (platinum and palladium) from the US PGM operations.

In 2025, the group employed 72,668 people, mostly in South Africa. Sibanye-Stillwater is one of the largest private sector employers in South Africa and the largest industrial employer in the state of Montana.

Sibanye-Stillwater's primary listing is on the Johannesburg Stock Exchange (JSE) in South Africa. The company trades under ticker codes JSE:SSW (previously SGL) and NYSE:SBSW as of its relisting on February 19, 2020.

== Controversies ==
=== Marikana miners' strike (Lonmin) ===
In 2012, what started as a peaceful protest resulted in a massacre. The Marikana massacre was the killing of thirty-four miners by the South African Police Service (SAPS) on 16 August 2012, during a wildcat strike at the Lonmin platinum mine in Marikana, Rustenburg, North West province, South Africa. The violence started because of a history of antagonism and violence between the African National Congress-allied National Union of Mineworkers (NUM) and its emerging rival, the Association of Mineworkers and Construction Union (AMCU). At the Marikana platinum mine, operated by Lonmin at Nkaneng near Rustenburg, 3,000 workers walked off the job on 10 August after Lonmin failed to meet with workers. On 11 August, NUM leaders allegedly opened fire on striking NUM members who were marching to their offices. The killing of two miners was reported in the South African media as a central reason for the breakdown in trust within the union amongst workers. Despite earlier contradictory reports, the clashes on the 11th are now acknowledged to be the first incidents of violence during the strike.

According to the Bench Marks Foundation, the violence erupted against a backdrop of a lack of employment opportunities for local youth, squalid living conditions, unemployment and growing inequalities. It claimed the workers were exploited and this was a motivation for the violence. It also criticised the high profits when compared with the low wages of the workers.

Following Sibanye-Stillwater's acquisition of Lonmin in 2019, Sibanye-Stillwater launched The Marikana Renewal process in 2020, led by Thabo Makgoba, the Archbishop of Cape Town, to address the Marikana legacy, to rebuild trust and to provide the socio-economic redress necessary to secure a long-term future for all stakeholders.https://www.renewalprogramme.co.za/honour/history

=== 2018 fatalities ===
In early 2018, 20 out of the 45 mining deaths in South Africa occurred at Sibanye Stillwater. Then Minister of Mineral Resources, Gwede Mantashe, deplored the figure: "We are very worried about the fact that out of 45 fatalities thus far, 20 are from one company." Another death was reported a few weeks later.

== See also ==
- Umsinde Emoyeni Wind Power Station
