= Stillwater Mining Company =

Palladium and platinum mining company

- Traded as: NYSE: SWC (2001-2017); S&P 600 Component
- Headquarters: Thunder Bay, Canada
- Website: stillwatermining.com

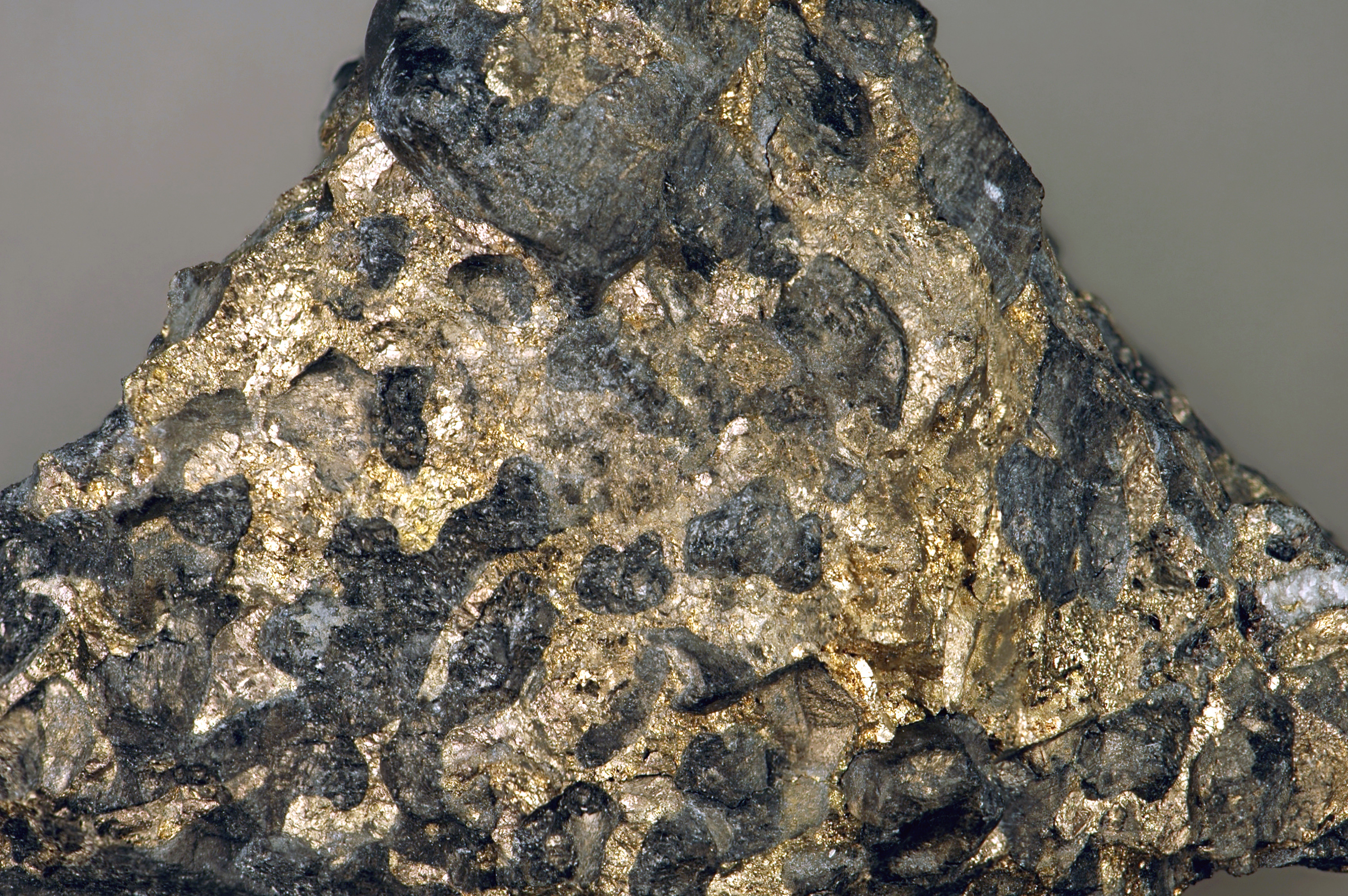
Sulfidic serpentintite platinum-palladium ore, Stillwater Mine. This ore sample grades to around 2.5 ounces of Pd-Pt per ton of rock, with a Pd-Pt ratio of about 3:1.

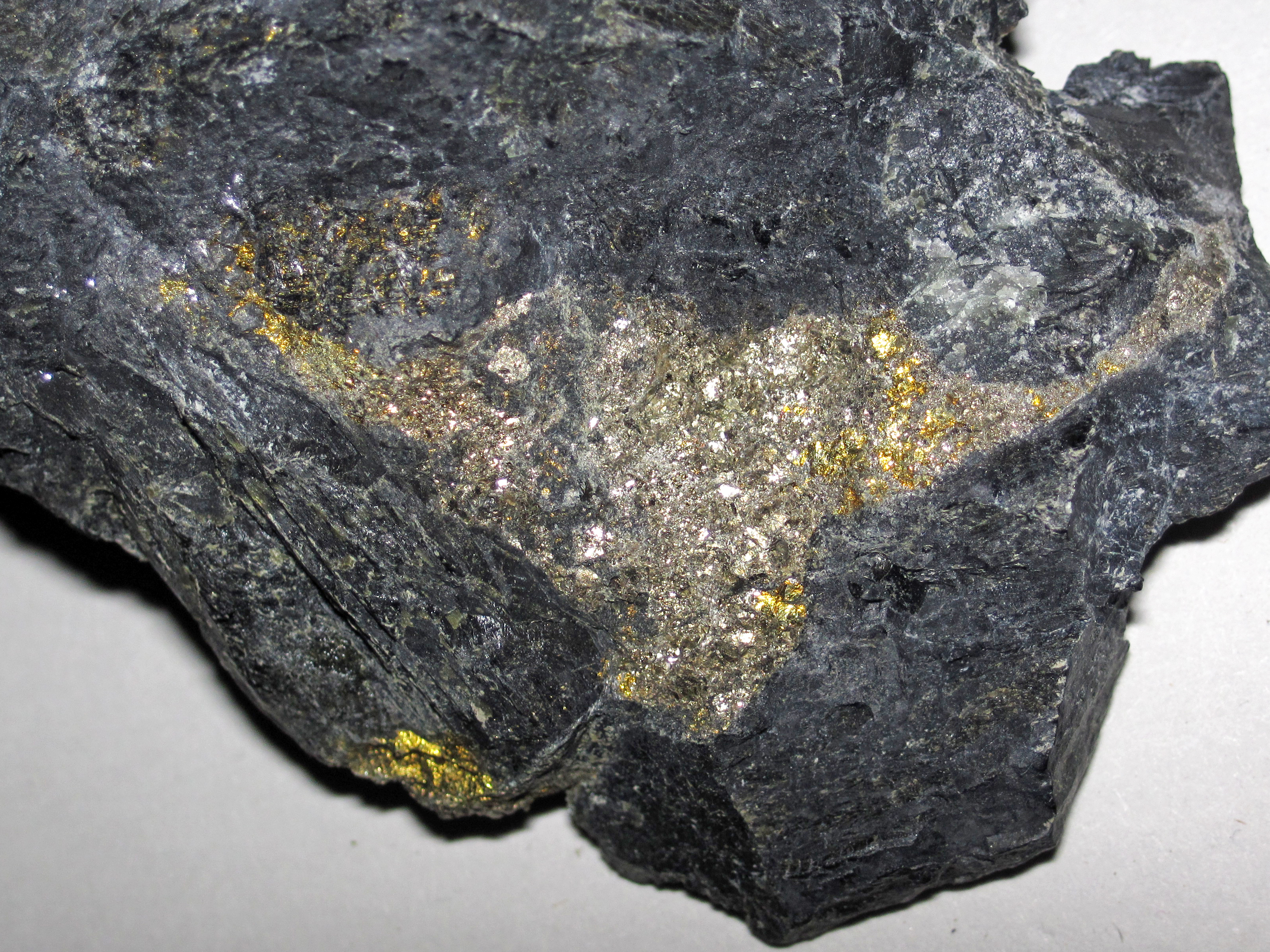
Another sample of Platinum-palladium ore from the Stillwater mine.

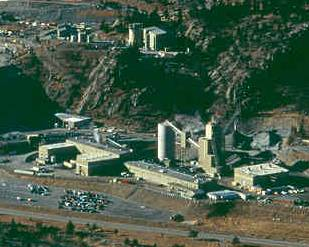
The Stillwater mine and mill

Stillwater Mining Company was a palladium and platinum mining company with headquarters located at Littleton, Colorado. It exists today as a division of Sibanye-Stillwater. It is the only palladium and platinum producer in the USA. The only other North America based palladium/platinum producer is North American Palladium, located in Canada. In 2017 it was acquired by Sibanye Gold Limited, who then began trading as Sibanye-Stillwater.

== Processing Mined Material ==
Stillwater Mining Company is engaged in the development, extraction, processing, refining and marketing of palladium, platinum and associated metals (platinum group metals or PGMs) from a geological formation in the Stillwater igneous complex in south central Montana known as the J-M Reef and from the recycling of spent catalytic converters. The J-M Reef is the only known significant source of platinum group metals inside the United States and one of the significant resources outside South Africa and Russia. Associated by-product metals at the Company’s operations include minor amounts of gold, silver, nickel and copper. The J-M Reef is a narrow but extensive mineralized zone containing PGMs, which has been traced over a strike length of approximately 28 miles (45 km).

The company conducts mining operations at the Stillwater Mine (45.38932°N 109.87539°W) near Nye, Montana and at the East Boulder Mine (45.50471°N 110.0862°W) near Big Timber, Montana. Both mines are located on the J-M Reef. The company operates concentrating plants at each mining operation to upgrade mined production to a concentrate form. The company operates a smelter and base metal refinery at Columbus, Montana at which it further purifies the mined production to a PGM-rich filter cake. The filter cake is shipped to third-party custom refiners for final refining before being sold.

The company recycles spent catalyst material to recover PGMs at the smelter and refinery. The company has a longterm catalyst sourcing agreement and spot contracts with other suppliers who ship spent catalysts to the company for processing to recover PGMs. The company smelts and refines the spent catalysts by the same process as the mined production is purified.

== Business ==
The Johns-Manville Corporation was prospecting for PGM in the Stillwater Complex since around 1972. In 1979 they began development in a joint venture with the Chevron Corporation. In 1984 the Stillwater Mining Company was created with a third partner, Lac Minerals Exploration (Texas) Inc, and production began in 1986, was increased to 700tpd in 1987 and to 1,000tpd in 1988. LAC left the enterprise in late 1988 and JM and Chevron became 50-50 partners. A smelter was installed at the mine site in February 1989. Behre Dolbear & Co (mining consultants) produced an estimate dated 1990 of 19,427,000 tons of probable reserves (average 0.80 ounces of Pd and Pt per ton - 15,495,000 ounces total - 3.5 parts Pd for each 1 part Pt - before processing losses).

Stillwater Mining Company was incorporated in Delaware in December 1992 to continue the enterprise. Effective October 1, 1993 it received all the assets of the two predecessors, which were Colorado general partnerships equally owned by Chevron and Manville: Stillwater Mining Company (SMC) and Stillwater PGM Resources (SPGMR). Manville and Chevron each owned 7,500,000 (50%) of the shares of the new company. On September 16, 1994 Chevrons 50% stake was bought back by the company for $44 million with funding from a private placement of 7,500,000 shares at $5.87 per share and $25 million of convertible bonds, all of which were converted at the time of the initial public offering on December 22, 1994. During the IPO, $53.7 million were raised from the sale of 4,500,000 shares at $13 per share (to provide funds to double mine capacity to 2,000tpd), whereas in addition Manville sold 2,112,500 of its shares and reduced its own stake to 27% (Manville received $25.5 million and retained 5.4 million shares; Manville's 2.1 million shares apparently were given to the holders of the convertible bonds: there were only some 20 million shares outstanding after the IPO). Manville then sold its remaining shares to institutional investors on August 23, 1995. In April and May 1996 SMC issued $51.45 million of 7-year 7% convertible notes (conversion price of $26.80 per share corresponding to ca. 1.9 million shares). The notes were called on May 1, 1999 and substantially all were converted into, after accounting for the December 31, 1998 3-for-2 stock split, some 2,876 thousand shares.

Production
	Pd	Pt	Ore milled	Pd	Pt	Ore milled
Unit x1000	ounces		tons	ounces		tons
Mine	Stillwater			East Boulder		
1992	175	53	345			
1993	218	66	363			
1994	207	63	373			
1995	169	51	398			
1996	196	59	446			
1997	271	84	577			
1998	340	104	719			
1999	315	94	689			
2000	330	100	756			
2001	388	116	894	17	5	85
2002	379	113	947	97	28	384
2003	328	100	814	122	34	455
...
2007	274	85	715	139	39	529
2008	268	81	768	116	34	438
2009	302	92	777	105	31	407
2010	271	81	781	103	30	400
2011	297	90	793	102	29	417

SMC was listed on the NYSE in 2001. It was formerly traded as SWC on the AMEX.

The 2,000tpd East Boulder mine and concentrator began commercial operation on January 1, 2002. Due to weak demand at a rate of 1,000tpd.

Norilsk Nickel had bought a 51% stake in Stillwater in 2003, but in November 2010 Norilsk Nickel announced plans to sell this stake. The South African mining company Sibanye Gold Limited proposed in December 2016 to acquire Stillwater for $2.2 billion ($18/share, a 61-percent premium over its average share price during the previous 52 weeks). The merger was approved by the Committee on Foreign Investments in April 2017 and was completed in May. The new owners pledged to honor Stillwater's Good Neighbor Agreement, which requires notification of surrounding communities about anything which might affect them.

In December 2010, the Company acquired Marathon PGM Corporation. It was renamed Stillwater Canada.

== Controversies ==
In 2002, two class action suits were filed against the company, wherein stakeholders claimed that the Stillwater was artificially inflating the price of its securities. On Nov 1, 2004, Stillwater Mining restated its third quarter results, during which payment for debt issuance costs was $3.8 million, not a receipt of $0.8 million as originally reported.

In 2006, a group of shareholders won a $2.6 million settlement against the company for "misleading statements about the company's financial performance" and its ore reserves.
