= Cooperite =

Cooperite may refer to:

- Cooperites, members of the Gloriavale Christian Community
- Cooperite (mineral)
