= Driefontein mine =

Gold and uranium mine in South Africa

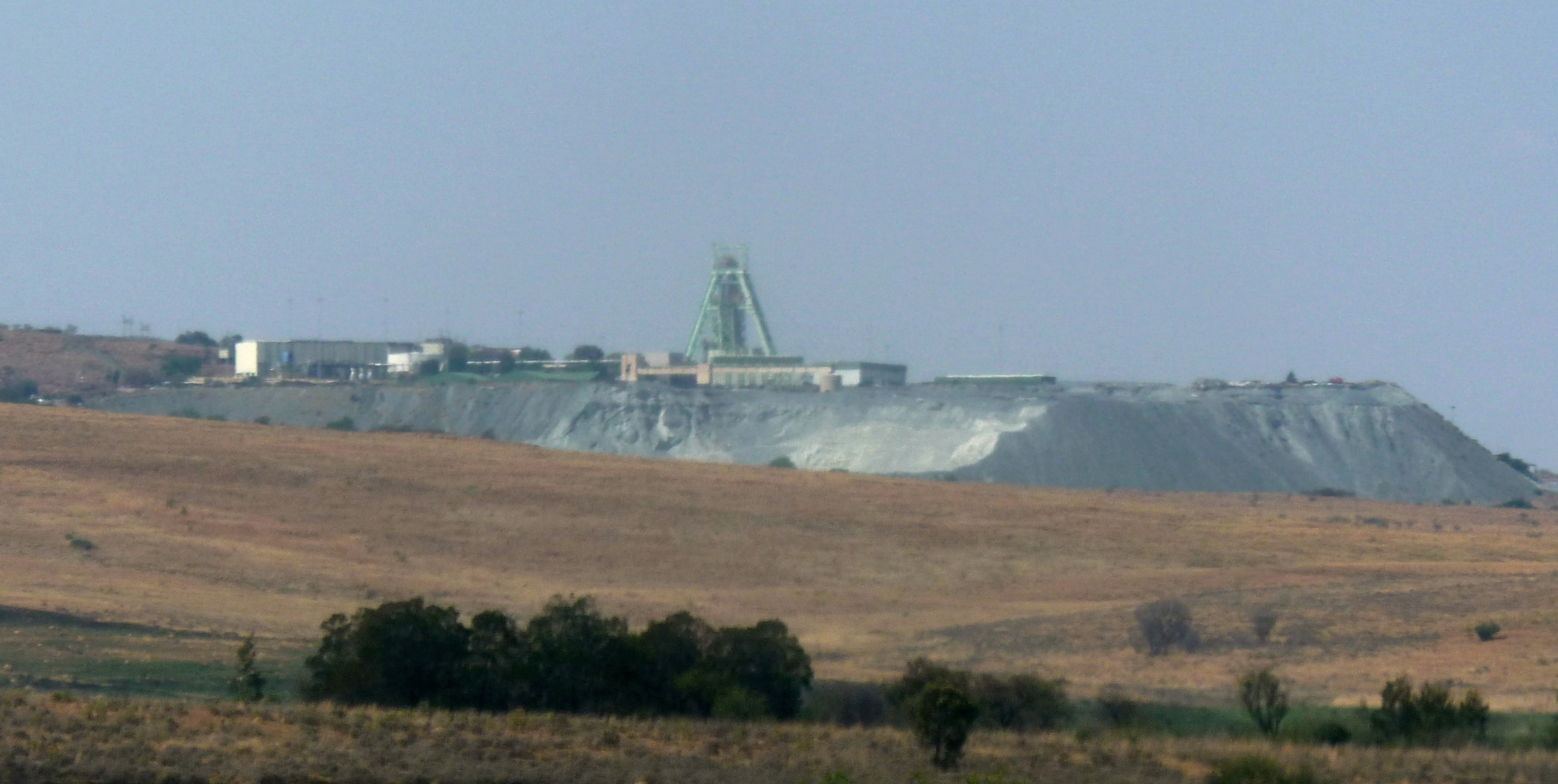
- No 5 or Hlanganani shaft of Driefontein mine, in the Westrand DM, Gauteng

- Location within South Africa

Location
- Location: Carletonville, Gauteng, South Africa; 26°23′26.16″S 27°29′24″E

Production
- Products: gold, uranium

Owner
- Company: Sibanye-Stillwater
- Website: www.sibanyestillwater.com/our-business/southern-africa/gold/driefontein/overview
- Acquired: 2002

The Driefontein mine is a large mine located in the northern part of South Africa in Gauteng. Driefontein is an important gold producer and represents one of the largest uranium reserves in South Africa having estimated reserves of 238 million tonnes of ore grading 0.0053% uranium.

== History ==
In 1937, aided by a magnetometer, Dr Rudolf Krahmann discovered vast gold deposits of the West Wits Line near Carletonville South Africa, including those developed as the Driefontein and Kloof (later KDC) mines.

In 1999, Gold Fields acquired Driefontein through the purchase AGA's 21.5% shareholding, then making Gold Fields the world's second largest gold producer. Gold Fields Ltd held full interest in GFI Mining South Africa (Proprietary) Limited which fully owned Driefontein.

On 30 August 2005, Driefontein officially poured its 100 millionth ounce of gold.

In 2006, Driefontein successfully converted its "old order mining licence"to new order MR" and its 9 Shaft completion project was approved.

In 2012, Gold Fields Limited unbundled its subsidiary, GFI Mining South Africa Proprietary Limited ("GFIMSA"), which was then renamed Sibanye Gold Limited ("Sibanye Gold"), [later Sibanye-Stillwater], and consisted of the KDC (formerly Kloof) and Beatrix mines, as well as an array of support service entities in South Africa.
