= Lac des Îles igneous complex =

Layered gabbroic intrusion in Ontario, Canada

Coordinates: 49°10′00″N 89°36′00″W

The Lac des Îles igneous complex of northwestern Ontario, Canada is a layered gabbroic intrusion which is the host for the largest palladium orebody in Canada. The orebody is currently being mined as a combined open pit and underground operation by North American Palladium.

The complex is located in the Canadian Shield some 85 kilometers northwest of Thunder Bay, Ontario and Lake Superior at 49.10.00 N 089.36.00 W. The complex includes gabbro, pyroxenite, gabbronorite and websterite intrusive into granitic gneiss country rock. The ore minerals occur within gabbroic pegmatites and gabbro breccia zones. The Archean complex has been dated at 2738 ±27 Ma by Sm–Nd dating on pyroxenite.

The Roby Zone orebody of the complex is a platinum group elements deposit with associated gold, copper and nickel mineralization. Ore mineralogy includes pyrrhotite, pentlandite, chalcopyrite, pyrite and the rare platinum group element minerals: vysotskite (Pd,Ni)S, braggite (Pt,Pd,Ni)S, kotulskite Pd(Te,Bi)_{1–2}, isomertieite Pd_{11}Sb_{2}As_{2}, merenskyite (Pd,Pt)(Te,Bi)_{2}, sperrylite PtAs_{2} and moncheite (Pt,Pd)(Te,Bi)_{2}.

== See also ==
- Palladium as an investment
