= North American Palladium =

- Company type: Public
- Traded as: TSX:PDL; AMEX:PAL
- Industry: Mining
- Founded: 1968
- Defunct: December 13, 2019
- Fate: Acquired by Impala Platinum
- Headquarters: Toronto, Ontario, Canada
- Key people: William Biggar CEO (2008-2012); Jim Gallagher CEO (2015-2020)
- Products: Palladium
- Website: www.napalladium.com

North American Palladium Ltd. is a former Canadian mining company that operated between 1968 and 2019 and that since 1993 operated the Lac des Iles mine in the Lac des Îles igneous complex of the Thunder Bay District of Ontario. The company primarily mined and explored for palladium but also for gold. Platinum, silver, nickel, and copper are mined as by-products. The company was listed on the Toronto Stock Exchange but was acquired by Impala Platinum in 2019.

== History ==
North American Palladium was founded in 1968 as Madeleine Mines Ltd. and was renamed to its current name in June 1993. The Lac des Iles mine began as an open pit mine in 1993. A new mill was commissioned at the mine in 2012, with mine's production rate increasing following that. Underground operations at Lac des Iles started in 2006. On October 21, 2008, the Lac des Iles mine was placed on "care and maintenance" due to declining metal prices. It was reopened on October 13, 2010. On May 26, 2009, the company acquired the Sleeping Giant gold mine through the acquisition of Cadiscor Resources Inc. On May 20, 2010, the company acquired the Vezza gold project, in the Abitibi region, from Agnico-Eagle Mines.

The only other North America based palladium or platinum producer is Stillwater Mining Company, located in Montana, USA.

North American Palladium Ltd. was purchased by Johannesburg-based Impala Platinum Holdings Limited for CA$1 billion in 2019. Under the terms of the deal, Brookfield Business Partners was paid $570 million for its 81% stake in the company and minority shareholders were paid $19.74 per share. From that point on, the Lac des Iles mine would be operated by the new company called Impala Canada Limited.
