= Keliber =

Finnish mining company

Keliber Oy
- Type: Osakeyhtiö
- Industry: Mining
- Founded: 1989
- Headquarters: Kokkola, Finland
- Key people: Seitovirta Mika Ilkka (Chairman); Hannu Hautala (CEO)
- Revenue: ▲€21 million (2025)
- Net income: ▼€−14 million (2025)
- Number of employees: 189 (2025)
- Parent: Sibanye-Stillwater (80%); Finnish Minerals Group (20%)

Keliber Oy is a Finnish mining company.

Keliber has been a subsidiary of the South African mining company Sibanye-Stillwater since 2022, which owns 80% of the shares. The remaining shares are owned by the state-owned Finnish Minerals Group.

== History ==
Keliber was founded in 1989 as a limited company. The Norwegian Nordic Mining ASA bought 68% of Keliber in 2008.

In 2017, the company raised €5 million from domestic investors through a share issue.

In 2018, Keliber completed a definitive feasibility study based on the production of battery-grade lithium carbonate, and in 2019 it published an updated feasibility study that shifted the planned end product to battery-grade lithium hydroxide.

In late 2022, Sibanye-Stillwater approved the implementation of the Keliber lithium project, and construction of the lithium refinery in Kokkola began in March 2023. Keliber officially began lithium mining on 12 February 2026.

== Operations ==
=== Lithium mining ===
The European Commission granted the Keliber lithium project "strategic project" status under the EU's Critical Raw Materials Act. Keliber owns several lithium deposits across Central Ostrobothnia, in Western Finland on the Gulf of Bothnia.

The Keliber lithium mining is expected to be the first lithium mining and processing operation in Europe, producing battery-grade lithium hydroxide. Keilber estimates an annual production of 15,000 tonnes of lithium hydroxide monohydrate for at least 18 years. Their quarry is located at Syväjärvi, and then the mined resources are moved to a concentrator in Päiväneva, and lastly moved to Kokkola chemical plant where it is refined into lithium hydroxide for sale to battery manufacturers.

Keliber plans to open six other mining areas in the Kaustinen, Kokkola and Kronoby areas.
