= Canadian Palladium Maple Leaf =

Official bullion palladium coin of Canada

Palladium Maple Leaf
- Canada
- Value: 50 Canadian dollars (face value)
- Mass: 31.110 g (1.00 troy oz)
- Diameter: 34 mm
- Edge: Serrated
- Composition: 99.95% Pd
- Years of minting: 2005-2007; 2009; 2015–present

Obverse
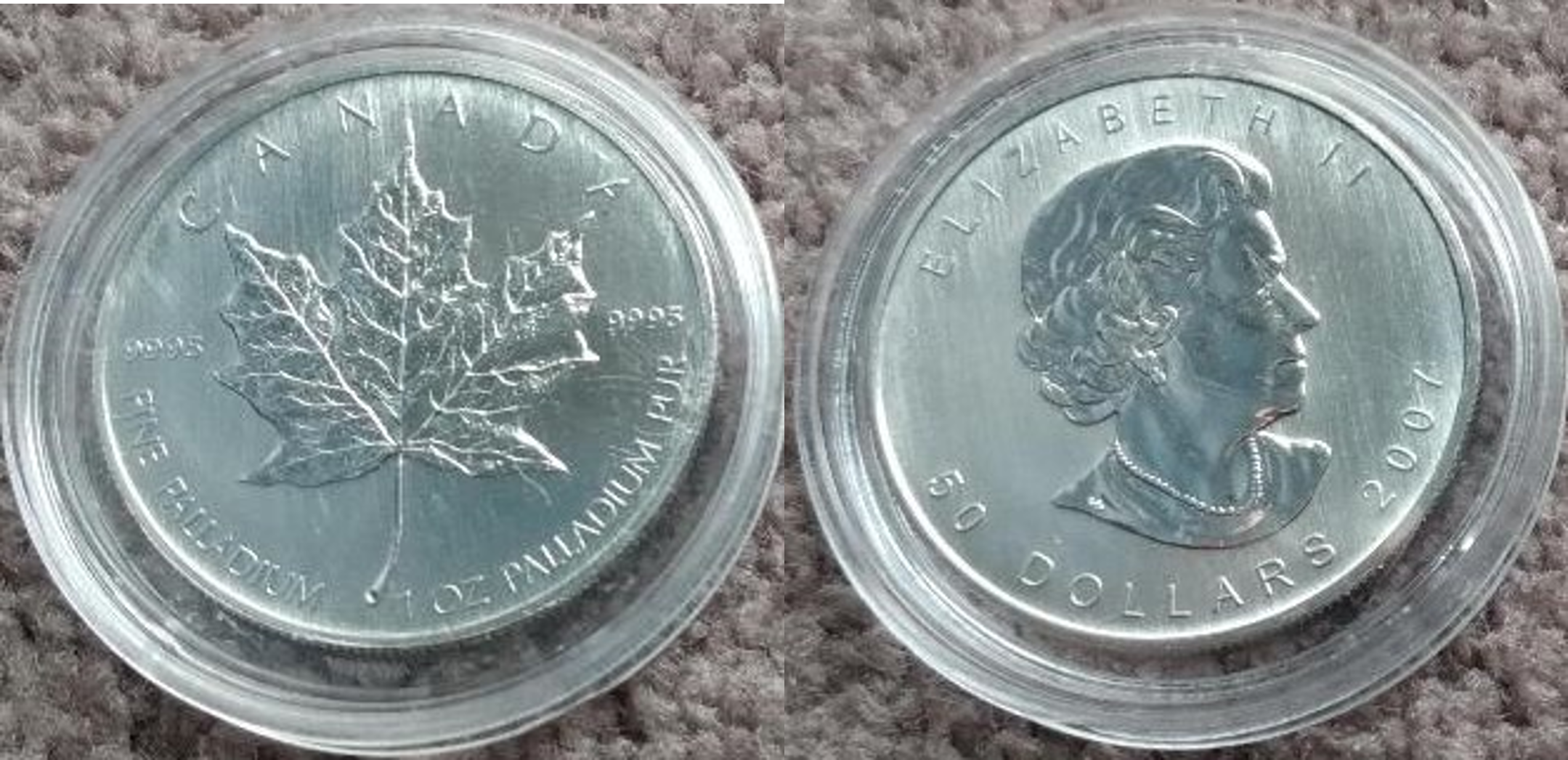
- Design: Queen Elizabeth II

Reverse
- Design: Maple Leaf

The Canadian Palladium Maple Leaf is the official bullion palladium coin of Canada. It is issued by the Royal Canadian Mint in .9995 purity. The coins have legal tender status in Canada, but as is often the case with bullion coins, the face values of these coins is lower than the market price of the material they are made from. Unlike the gold, silver and platinum maple leaf series, the palladium maple leaf is subject to the GST/HST tax.

The newest member of the Maple Leaf family of pure bullion coins, the palladium Maple Leaf, was first minted in November 2005. The Royal Canadian Mint produced the first government issued palladium bullion coin from 2005 to 2007, and then for a further one-off year in 2009. They were reintroduced in 2015 and have been produced every year since.

== See also ==
- Canadian Gold Maple Leaf
- Canadian Silver Maple Leaf
- Canadian Platinum Maple Leaf
- American Palladium Eagle
- Palladium as an investment
