= Aquarius Platinum =

Aquarius Platinum plc
- Type: Public (LSE: AQP) (ASX: AQP) (JSE: AQP)
- Industry: Mining
- Founded: 1920
- Headquarters: Bermuda
- Key people: Nicholas Sibley, Chairman; Jean Nel, CEO
- Revenue: $682.9 million (2011)
- Operating income: $203.2 million (2011)
- Net income: $(10.4) million (2011)

Aquarius Platinum plc is a Bermuda-registered and headquartered mining business.

Aquarius was quoted on the London Stock Exchange, the Australian Stock Exchange and the Johannesburg Stock Exchange and also had a sponsored Level 1 ADR program in the United States until it was acquired by Sibanye Gold in April 2016.

== History ==
The company was established in 1920 as the Mount Monger Gold Mining company to exploit the Kalgoorlie goldfield. In 1984 it was listed on the Australian Stock Exchange.

In 1995 it acquired Gemex Exploration & Mining Company and Randex Platinum Holdings and in 1996 it acquired Pacific Platinum so giving it control of the Kroondal Mine.

In 1998 the company entered into a strategic alliance with Impala Platinum Holdings. The company was first listed on the London Stock Exchange in that year.

In 2003 the company entered into an agreement with Anglo Platinum to pool and share certain mining interests.

In 2012, large scale mining protests across South Africa caused violent labour unrest and prompted the firm's CEO, Stuart Murray, to resign.

In February 2013, Aquarius appointed former Anglo American director Sonja de Bruyn Sebotsa to its board of directors. De Bruyn Sebotsa would also assume the role of chairperson of Aquarius’ local subsidiary Aquarius Platinum South Africa.

In April 2016 the company was acquired by Sibanye Gold.

== Operations ==
The company's activities are concentrated in the Bushveld Complex in South Africa and Zimbabwe. It operates the following mines:

- Kroondal Mine, South Africa
- Marikana Mine, South Africa
- Everest Mine, South Africa
- Mimosa Mine, Zimbabwe (50% interest)
