= American Palladium Eagle =

Palladium bullion coin of the United States

Palladium Eagle
- United States
- Value: 25.00 U.S. dollars (face value)
- Mass: 31.120 g (1.0005 troy oz)
- Diameter: 34.036 mm (1.340 in)
- Edge: Reeded
- Composition: 99.95% Pd
- Years of minting: 2017–present

Obverse
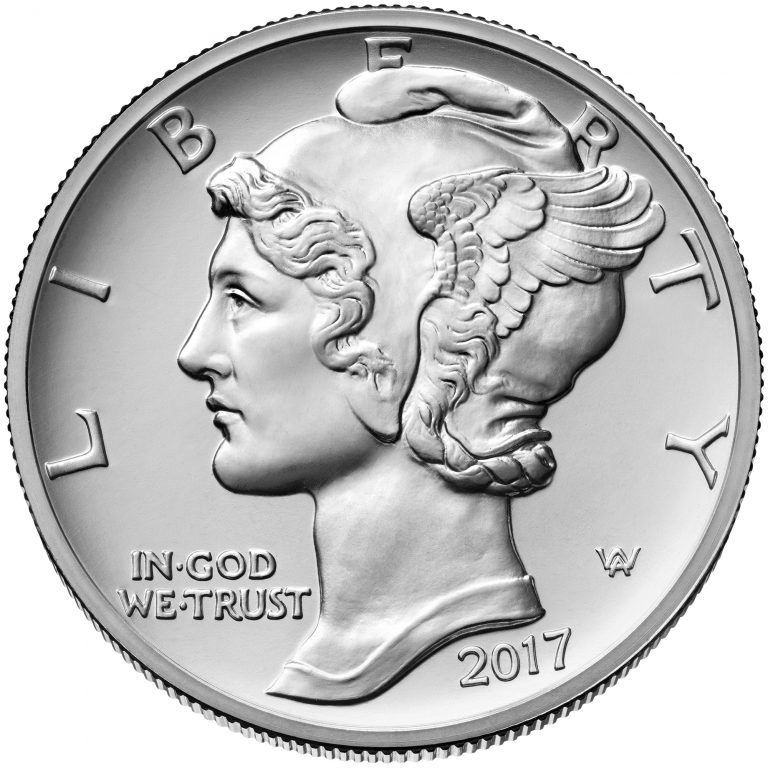
- Design: Winged Liberty
- Designer: Adolph A. Weinman (original Mercury dime)
- Design date: 1916

Reverse
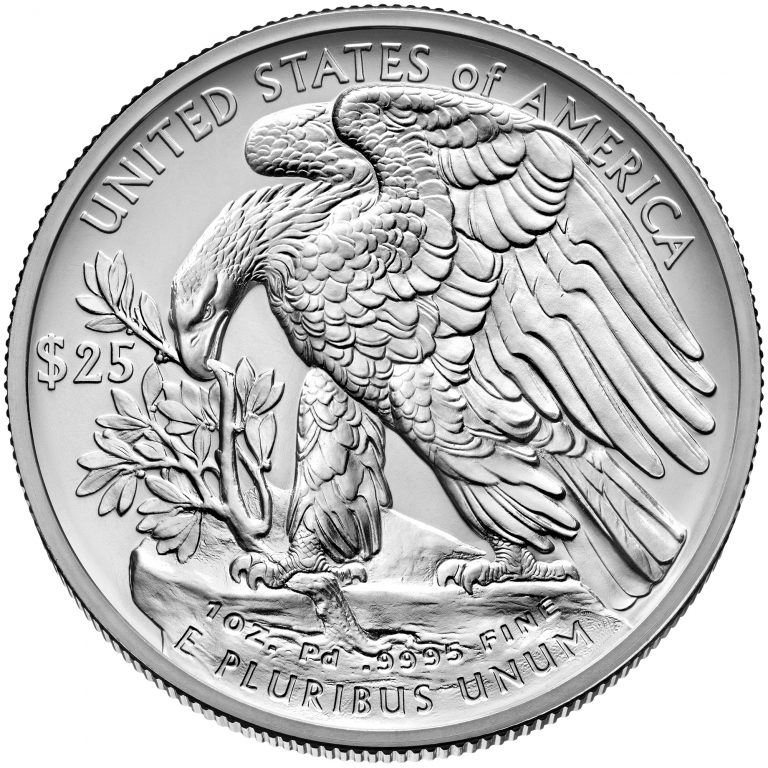
- Design: Standing eagle with upraised wings pulling a laurel branch out of a rock
- Designer: Adolph A. Weinman (original concept for the 1907 American Institute of Architects gold medal)
- Design date: 1907

The American Palladium Eagle is the official palladium bullion coin of the United States. Each coin has a face value of $25 and is composed of 99.95% fine palladium, with 1 troy ounce (31.1 g) actual palladium weight.

== History ==
The Palladium Eagle was authorized by the American Eagle Palladium Bullion Coin Act of 2010 which became Public Law 111-303 passed during the 111th United States Congress in December 2010 and signed by President Barack Obama.

The coins' obverse uses Adolph Weinman's design of the Winged Liberty Head "Mercury" dime, which was minted from 1916 to 1945. It portrays the Goddess of Liberty wearing a winged hat. The Palladium Eagle's reverse design is based on Weinman's 1907 American Institute of Architects (AIA) medal design. The Mint was directed to obtain an independent study of whether there would be enough market demand to justify the issuance of the piece; it voided its first contract for such a study on learning that the contracted firm had ties to the palladium industry. The contract was re-awarded to New York-based CPM Group, which conducted the necessary research between May and July 2012. On March 1, 2013, the Mint submitted a report to Congress based on the study, finding that demand would most likely not be sufficient to sustain a market in palladium bullion coins.

A bullion version sold directly to the United States Mint's authorized purchasers was released on September 25, 2017 and a proof version priced at $1,387.50 was released on September 6, 2018. Both offerings were met with a strong response; the 2017 bullion version sold out on the day of release, and within five minutes, sales of the 2018 proof version were suspended pending verification of the 14,782 existing orders out of a maximum of 15,000. Secondary market sales for the proof version were also strong on September 6, with many listings selling at a $600 premium over the Mint's asking price. A 2019 reverse proof version was released on September 12, 2019.

== Mintage figures ==
The mintage of the 2017 Bullion and 2018-W Proof finishes was limited to 15,000 pieces each, while the 2019-W Reverse Proof finish is limited to 30,000 pieces.

2020 Burnished/Uncirculated (Mintage: 10,000) and 2021 Proof (Mintage: 12,000) marked the start of the decline of large total Palladium American Eagle sales with 9,746 (2020) and 5,170 (2021) respectively. An unannounced late release bullion coin in 2021, the second of such release, boosted the decrease in 2021 sales with an additional 8700 sold.

2022 saw the first significant reduction in mintage numbers, most likely as a result of decreased sales, which would be a trend that has followed:

2022 Reverse Proof Mintage: 7,500

2023 Burnished/Uncirculated Mintage: 6,000

2024 Proof Mintage: 7,500

2025 Reverse Proof Mintage: 6,000

2026 Burnished/Uncirculated Mintage: 5,000

American Palladium Eagle mintage figures
Year/ Mintmark	Mintage Limit	Mintage				
Year/ Mintmark	Mintage Limit	Bullion	Burnished / Uncirculated	Proof	Reverse Proof	Total Sales
2017	15,000	15,000	-	-	-	15,000
2018-W	15,000	-	-	14,986	-	14,986
2019-W	30,000	-	-	-	18,839	18,839
2020-W	10,000	-	9,746	-	-	9,746
2021-W	12,000	-	-	5,170	-	5,170
2021	8,700	8,700	-	-	-	8,700
2022-W	7,500	-	-	-	7,439	7,439
2023-W	6,000	-	5,784	-	-	5,784
2024-W	7,500	-	-	5,961	-	5,961
2025-W	6,000	-	-	-	3,991	3,991
2026-W	5,000	-	4,778	-	-	4,778
Total	122,700	23,700	20,308	26,117	30,269	100,394

== See also ==
- American Silver Eagle – United States silver bullion coin program
- America the Beautiful silver bullion coins – United States silver bullion coin program
- American Buffalo (coin) – United States gold bullion coin program
- American Gold Eagle – United States gold bullion coin program
- American Platinum Eagle – United States platinum bullion coin program
- Bullion
- Bullion coin
- Canadian Palladium Maple Leaf – Canadian palladium bullion coin program
- Inflation hedge
- Palladium as an investment
