= KDC mine =

Uranium mine in South Africa

KDC
- Location: Gauteng, South Africa
- Products: uranium

The KDC mine, formerly the Kloof mine, is a large mine located in the northern part of South Africa in Gauteng, near Carletonville, and represents one of the largest uranium reserves in South Africa having estimated reserves of 256.4 million tonnes of ore grading 0.0036% uranium.

In 2012, Gold Fields Limited unbundled its subsidiary, GFI Mining South Africa Proprietary Limited (“GFIMSA”), which was then renamed Sibanye Gold Limited (“Sibanye Gold”), and consisted of the KDC (formerly Kloof) and Beatrix mines, as well as an array of support service entities in South Africa.

== 2012 strike ==
In the aftermath of the Marikana massacre, workers at KDC West – formerly known as the Driefontein mine and by then the west section of KDC – entered an unprotected strike on 9 September, seeking a wage increase, among other demands. On 21 September, the strike spread to the west section of Gold Fields's Beatrix mine in the Free State; by 24 September, the entirety of the Beatrix mine had been affected. Thus, by 25 September, the majority of the workforce at both mines – 15,000 employees at KDC West and 9,000 employees at Beatrix – were on strike, and Gold Fields halted production at both mines. Imitating the Lonmin workers at Marikana, Gold Fields strikers gathered and held vigil on a hill near to the mine. Gold Fields ordered the striking workers to vacate the mining hostels, where it said they had intimidated other workers and planned criminal activities; the hostels were later raided by Gold Fields private security, supported by SAPS. On 12 October, over 70 Gold Fields miners were arrested for public violence in connection with the strike. In response, several days later, the KDC West strike was joined by approximately 8,500 of the 12,400 employees employed at KDC East. With both sections of the KDC mine now affected – and 19,500 workers participating in KDC's workforce of 26,700 – Gold Fields suspended production at the entire KDC mine. However, the Gold Fields strike began to approach its resolution about a week later, when Gold Fields began issuing a series of ultimatums to its workers, threatening them with dismissal if they did not return to work. Many of the Beatrix employees returned on 16 October, and most of the KDC West employees followed on 18 October – though Gold Fields had to follow through on its ultimatum, firing 1,500 KDC West employees who did not show up for work before the deadline. However, an ultimatum failed to end the strike at KDC East and led Gold Fields to fire 8,100 workers there; most of those fired were later reinstated when the KDC East strike finally ended in early November.
