= Cooperite (mineral) =

Sulfide mineral

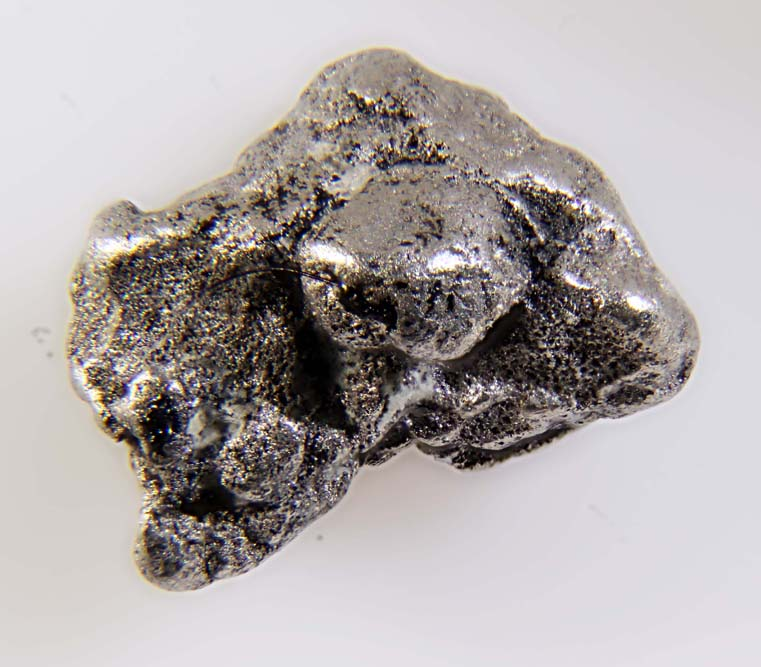
- Cooperite specimen from Tulameen River, Princeton, British Columbia, Canada

General
- Category: Minerals
- Formula: PtS (also PdS, NiS)
- IMA symbol: Cpe
- Strunz classification: 2.CC.35b
- Dana classification: 2.8.5.1
- Crystal system: Tetragonal
- Crystal class: Tetragonal - Ditetragonal dipyramidal
- Space group: P4_{2}/mmc (No. 131)
- Unit cell: 73.57 Å³ (Calculated from Unit Cell)

Identification
- Colour: Steel gray
- Twinning: Occasional
- Fracture: Conchoidal
- Mohs scale hardness: 4–5
- Luster: Metallic
- Diaphaneity: Opaque
- Specific gravity: 9.5
- Density: 9.5 g/cm^{3} (Measured), 10.2 g/cm^{3} (Calculated)
- Pleochroism: Visible: white to creamy white or bluish white

Major varieties
- Form: Distorted crystal fragments, irregular grains to 1.5 mm

Cooperite is a grey mineral consisting of platinum sulfide (PtS), generally in combinations with sulfides of other elements such as palladium and nickel (PdS and NiS). Its general formula is (Pt,Pd,Ni)S. It is a dimorph of braggite.

It is mined as an ore of platinum and platinum group metals such as palladium. It occurs in South Africa in minable quantities and in an old mine near Mount Washington on Vancouver Island.

It was first described in 1928 for occurrences in the Bushveld Igneous Complex and named after South African metallurgist Richard A. Cooper who first characterized it.

Local coordination in ideal cooperite (PtS): planar coordination around platinum (left) and distorted tetrahedral coordination around sulfur (right). Both centers have four nearest neighbors.

== See also ==
- List of minerals
- List of minerals named after people
