= Rudolf Krahmann =

Rudolf Krahmann (1896 - 1971) was a German geophysicist who was instrumental in discovering one of the richest gold fields of South Africa.

Krahmann was born in Berlin; his father was a professor of Mining Economy at the University of Berlin. As a young man, Krahmann studied economic geology, before taking a job as a prospector for which he travelled extensively (Austria, Hungary, Romania, Poland, Spain, Java, Australia, New Zealand). In the course of this work, he developed a method of prospecting by means of a magnetometer.

In February 1930, Krahmann and his wife Gertrud emigrated to South Africa. A few months later, while sitting on a hill near Krugersdorp, an area already famed for its gold, he noticed that his compass was being deflected by rocks that were rich in iron. He realized that he could search for gold indirectly, by using a magnetometer to trace the iron-rich shales associated with the deep gold deposits of the Witwatersrand. This soon led to the discovery of two immense deep gold deposits, the Carbon Leader Reef and the Ventersdorp Contact Reef, and the establishment of a number of new gold mines.

Krahmann was a supporter of the Nazi party, and at the start of the second world war, he was interned in South Africa and then repatriated to Germany in 1944. In 1945 he was arrested by the Soviets, and spent more than three years as their prisoner in eastern Germany. He and his wife returned to South Africa in 1950.

In honor of Krahmann’s achievements, the highest award of the South African Geophysical Association is named the Krahmann Memorial Medal.
