= Palladium =

Palladium, _{46}Pd
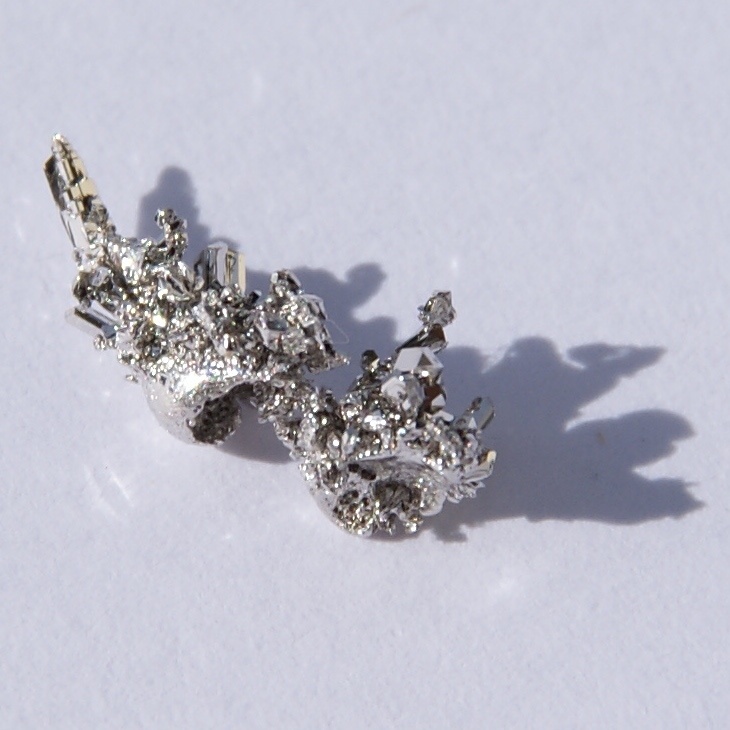

Palladium
- Pronunciation: /pəˈleɪdiəm/ (pə-LAY-dee-əm)
- Appearance: silvery white

Standard atomic weight A_{r}°(Pd)
- 106.42±0.01; 106.42±0.01 (abridged)

Palladium in the periodic table
Hydrogen																															Helium
Lithium	Beryllium																									Boron	Carbon	Nitrogen	Oxygen	Fluorine	Neon
Sodium	Magnesium																									Aluminium	Silicon	Phosphorus	Sulfur	Chlorine	Argon
Potassium	Calcium															Scandium	Titanium	Vanadium	Chromium	Manganese	Iron	Cobalt	Nickel	Copper	Zinc	Gallium	Germanium	Arsenic	Selenium	Bromine	Krypton
Rubidium	Strontium															Yttrium	Zirconium	Niobium	Molybdenum	Technetium	Ruthenium	Rhodium	Palladium	Silver	Cadmium	Indium	Tin	Antimony	Tellurium	Iodine	Xenon
Caesium	Barium	Lanthanum	Cerium	Praseodymium	Neodymium	Promethium	Samarium	Europium	Gadolinium	Terbium	Dysprosium	Holmium	Erbium	Thulium	Ytterbium	Lutetium	Hafnium	Tantalum	Tungsten	Rhenium	Osmium	Iridium	Platinum	Gold	Mercury (element)	Thallium	Lead	Bismuth	Polonium	Astatine	Radon
Francium	Radium	Actinium	Thorium	Protactinium	Uranium	Neptunium	Plutonium	Americium	Curium	Berkelium	Californium	Einsteinium	Fermium	Mendelevium	Nobelium	Lawrencium	Rutherfordium	Dubnium	Seaborgium	Bohrium	Hassium	Meitnerium	Darmstadtium	Roentgenium	Copernicium	Nihonium	Flerovium	Moscovium	Livermorium	Tennessine	Oganesson
Ni
↑
Pd
↓
Pt
rhodium ← palladium → silver
- Atomic number (Z): 46
- Group: group 10
- Period: period 5
- Block: d-block
- Electron configuration: [Kr] 4d^{10}
- Electrons per shell: 2, 8, 18, 18

Physical properties
- Phase at STP: solid
- Melting point: 1828.05 K (1554.9 °C, 2830.82 °F)
- Boiling point: 3236 K (2963 °C, 5365 °F)
- Density (at 20° C): 12.007 g/cm^{3}
- when liquid (at m.p.): 10.38 g/cm^{3}
- Heat of fusion: 16.74 kJ/mol
- Heat of vaporization: 358 kJ/mol
- Molar heat capacity: 25.98 J/(mol·K)
- Specific heat capacity: 244.127 J/(kg·K)
Vapor pressure
P (Pa)	1	10	100	1 k	10 k	100 k
at T (K)	1721	1897	2117	2395	2753	3234

Atomic properties
- Oxidation states: common: 0, +2, +4 +1, +3, +5
- Electronegativity: Pauling scale: 2.20
- Ionization energies: 1st: 804.4 kJ/mol; 2nd: 1870 kJ/mol; 3rd: 3177 kJ/mol
- Atomic radius: empirical: 137 pm
- Covalent radius: 139±6 pm
- Van der Waals radius: 163 pm
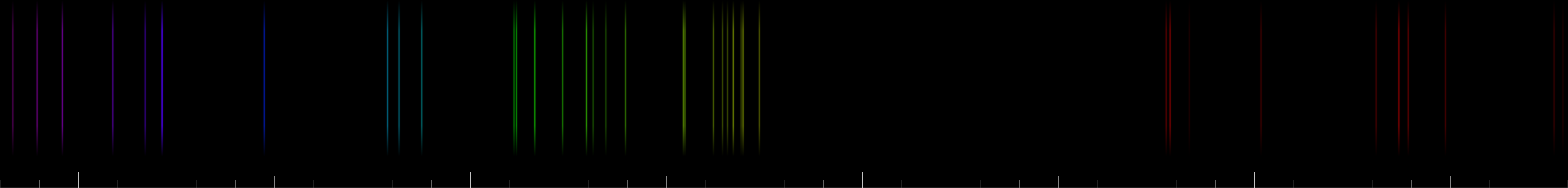
- Spectral lines of palladium

Other properties
- Natural occurrence: primordial
- Crystal structure: face-centered cubic (fcc) (cF4)
- Lattice constant: a = 389.02 pm (at 20 °C)
- Thermal expansion: 11.77×10^{−6}/K (at 20 °C)
- Thermal conductivity: 71.8 W/(m⋅K)
- Electrical resistivity: 105.4 nΩ⋅m (at 20 °C)
- Magnetic ordering: paramagnetic
- Molar magnetic susceptibility: +567.4×10^{−6} cm^{3}/mol (288 K)
- Young's modulus: 121 GPa
- Shear modulus: 44 GPa
- Bulk modulus: 180 GPa
- Speed of sound thin rod: 3070 m/s (at 20 °C)
- Poisson ratio: 0.39
- Mohs hardness: 4.75
- Vickers hardness: 400–600 MPa
- Brinell hardness: 320–610 MPa
- CAS Number: 7440-05-3

History
- Naming: after asteroid Pallas, itself named after Pallas Athena
- Discovery and first isolation: William Hyde Wollaston (1802)

Isotopes of palladium
Main isotopes			Decay	
Isotope	abundance	half-life (t_{1/2})	mode	product
^{100}Pd	synth	3.63 d	ε	^{100}Rh
^{102}Pd	1.02%	stable		
^{103}Pd	synth	16.99 d	ε	^{103}Rh
^{104}Pd	11.1%	stable		
^{105}Pd	22.3%	stable		
^{106}Pd	27.3%	stable		
^{107}Pd	trace	6.5×10^{6} y	β^{−}	^{107}Ag
^{108}Pd	26.5%	stable		
^{110}Pd	11.7%	stable		

Palladium is a chemical element; it has the symbol Pd and atomic number 46. It is a rare and lustrous silvery-white metal discovered in 1802 by the English chemist William Hyde Wollaston. He named it after the asteroid 2 Pallas, which was itself named after the epithet of the Greek goddess Athena, acquired by her when she slew Pallas. Palladium, platinum, rhodium, ruthenium, iridium and osmium form together a group of elements referred to as the platinum group metals. They have similar chemical properties, but palladium has the lowest melting point and is the least dense of them.

More than half the supply of palladium and its congener platinum is used in catalytic converters, which convert as much as 90% of the harmful gases in automobile exhaust (hydrocarbons, carbon monoxide, and nitrogen dioxide) into nontoxic substances (nitrogen, carbon dioxide and water vapor). Palladium is also used in electronics, dentistry, medicine, hydrogen purification, chemical applications, electrochemical sensors, electrosynthesis, groundwater treatment, and jewelry.

Ore deposits of palladium and other platinum group metals are rare. The most extensive deposits have been found in the norite belt of the Bushveld Igneous Complex covering the Transvaal Basin in South Africa; the Stillwater Complex in Montana, United States; the Sudbury Basin and Thunder Bay District of Ontario, Canada; and the Norilsk Complex in Russia. Recycling is also a source, mostly from scrapped catalytic converters. The numerous applications and limited supply sources result in considerable investment interest, and palladium is frequently sold as a precious metal in the form of palladium coins and bars.

== Characteristics ==
Palladium belongs to group 10 in the periodic table, but the configuration in the outermost electrons is in accordance with Hund's rule. Electrons that by the Madelung rule would be expected to occupy the 5s instead fill the 4d orbitals, as it is more energetically favorable to have a completely filled 4d^{10} shell instead of the 5s^{2} 4d^{8} configuration.

Z	Element	No. of electrons/shell
28	nickel	2, 8, 16, 2 (or 2, 8, 17, 1)
46	palladium	2, 8, 18, 18, 0
78	platinum	2, 8, 18, 32, 17, 1
110	darmstadtium	2, 8, 18, 32, 32, 16, 2 (predicted)

This 5s^{0} configuration, unique in period 5, makes palladium the heaviest element having only one incomplete electron shell, with all shells above it empty.

Palladium has the appearance of a soft silver-white metal that resembles platinum. It is the least dense and has the lowest melting point of the platinum group metals. It is soft and ductile when annealed and is greatly increased in strength and hardness when cold-worked. Palladium dissolves slowly in concentrated nitric acid, in hot, concentrated sulfuric acid, and when finely ground, in hydrochloric acid. It dissolves readily at room temperature in aqua regia.

Palladium does not react with oxygen at standard temperature (and thus does not tarnish in air). Palladium heated to 800 °C (1,070 K; 1,470 °F) will produce a layer of palladium(II) oxide (PdO). It may slowly develop a slight brownish coloration over time, likely due to the formation of a surface layer of its monoxide.

Palladium films with defects produced by alpha particle bombardment at low temperature exhibit superconductivity having T_{c} = 3.2 K (−269.95 °C).

=== Isotopes ===
Naturally occurring palladium is composed of six stable isotopes. The most stable radioisotopes are ^{107}Pd with a half-life of 6.5 million years (traces found in nature), ^{103}Pd with a half-life of 16.99 days, and ^{100}Pd with a half-life of 3.63 days. There are 25 other radioisotopes characterized ranging from ^{91}Pd to ^{129}Pd. These have half-lives of less than thirty minutes, except ^{101}Pd (8.47 hours), ^{109}Pd (13.6 hours), and ^{112}Pd (21.0 hours).

For isotopes with atomic masses less than that of the most abundant stable isotope, ^{106}Pd, the primary decay mode is electron capture with the primary decay product being rhodium. The primary mode of decay for those isotopes of Pd with atomic mass greater than 106 is beta decay with the primary product of this decay being silver.

Radiogenic ^{107}Ag is a decay product of ^{107}Pd and was first discovered in 1978 in the Santa Clara meteorite of 1976. The discoverers suggest that the coalescence and differentiation of iron-cored small planets may have occurred 10 million years after a nucleosynthetic event. ^{107}Pd versus Ag correlations observed in Solar System bodies must reflect the presence of short-lived nuclides in the early Solar System.

^{107}Pd is also produced as a fission product in spontaneous or induced fission of ^{235}U. As it is not very mobile in the environment and has a relatively low decay energy, ^{107}Pd is usually considered to be among the more benign of the long-lived fission products.

== Compounds ==
Palladium compounds exist primarily in the 0 and +2 oxidation state. Other less common states are also recognized. Generally the compounds of palladium are more similar to those of platinum than those of any other element.

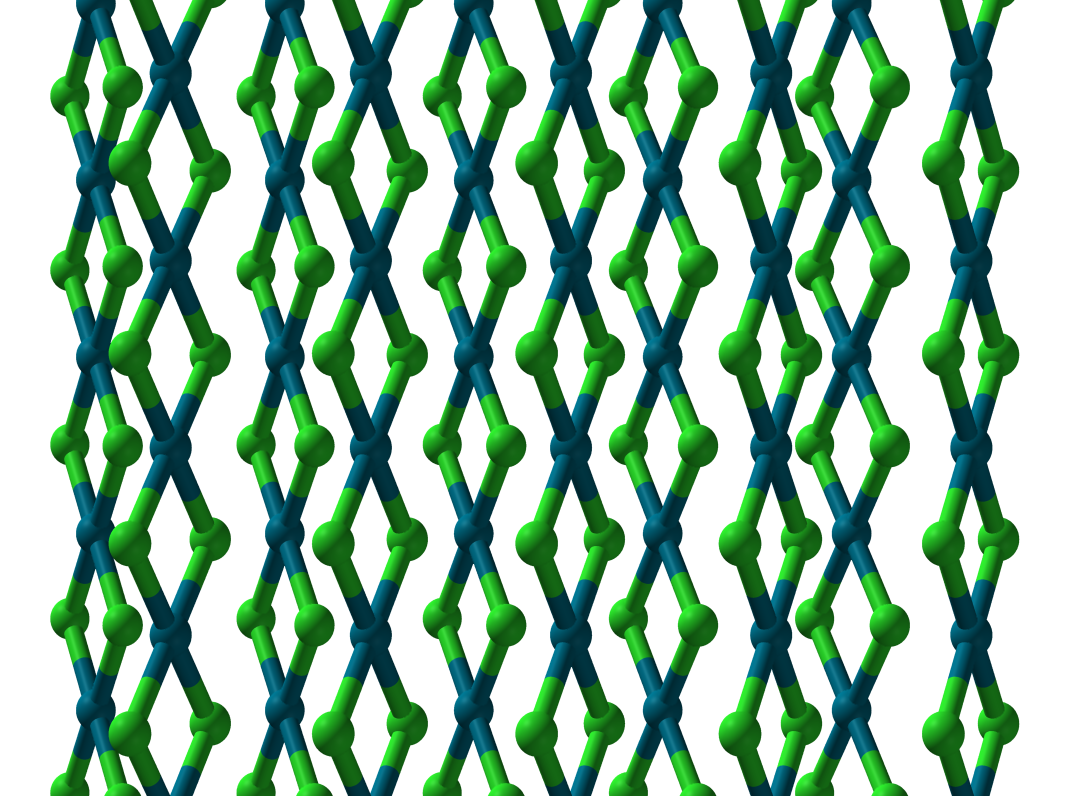
Structure of α-PdCl_{2}

=== Palladium(II) ===
Palladium(II) chloride is the principal starting material for other palladium compounds. It arises by the reaction of palladium with chlorine. It is used to prepare heterogeneous palladium catalysts such as palladium on barium sulfate, palladium on carbon, and palladium chloride on carbon. Solutions of PdCl_{2} in nitric acid react with acetic acid to give palladium(II) acetate, also a versatile reagent. PdCl_{2} reacts with ligands (L) to give square planar complexes of the type PdCl_{2}L_{2}. One example of such complexes is the benzonitrile derivative PdCl_{2}(PhCN)_{2}.

PdCl_{2} + 2 L → PdCl_{2}L_{2} (L = PhCN, PPh_{3}, NH_{3}, etc.)

The complex bis(triphenylphosphine)palladium(II) dichloride is a useful catalyst.

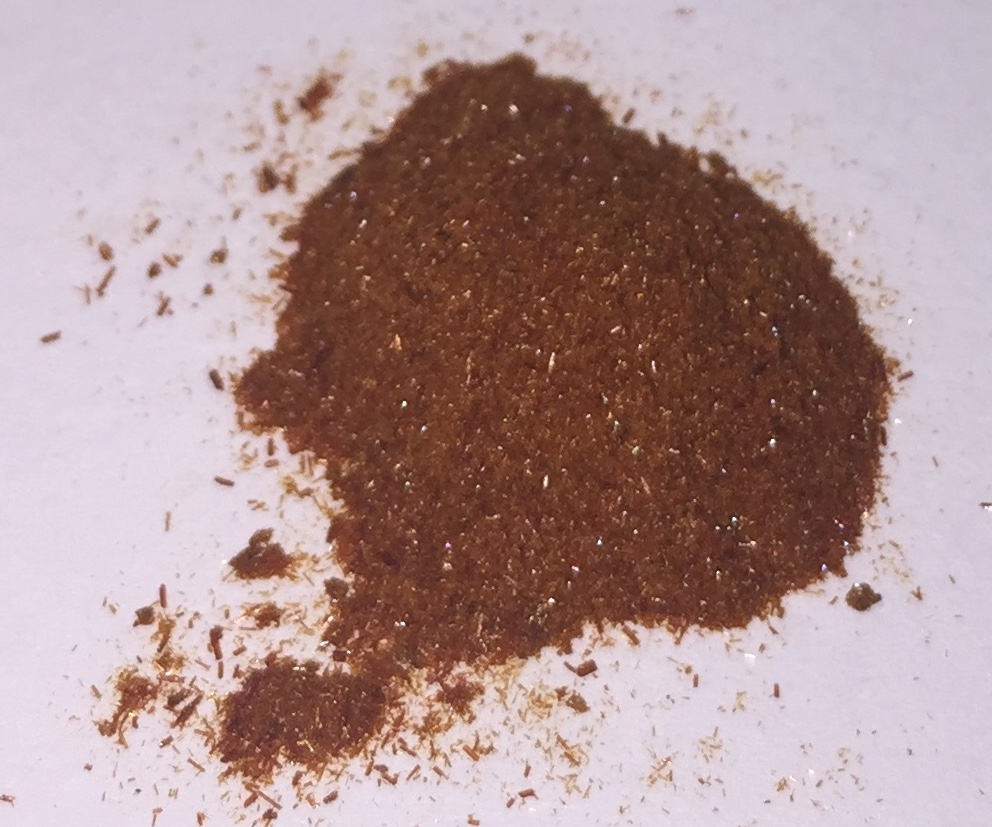
Palladium(II) acetate

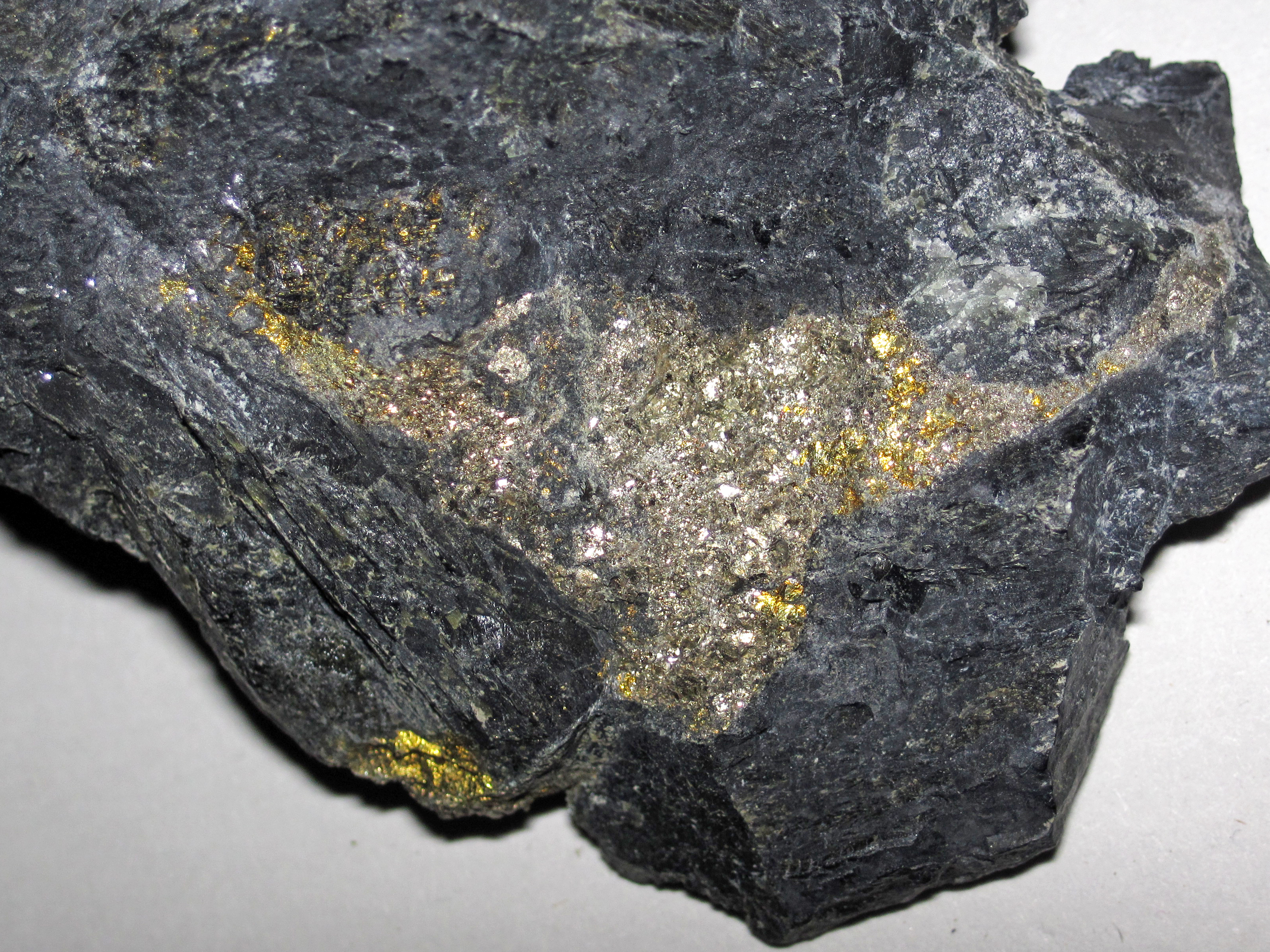
Platinum-palladium ore from the Stillwater mine in the Beartooth Mountains, Montana, US

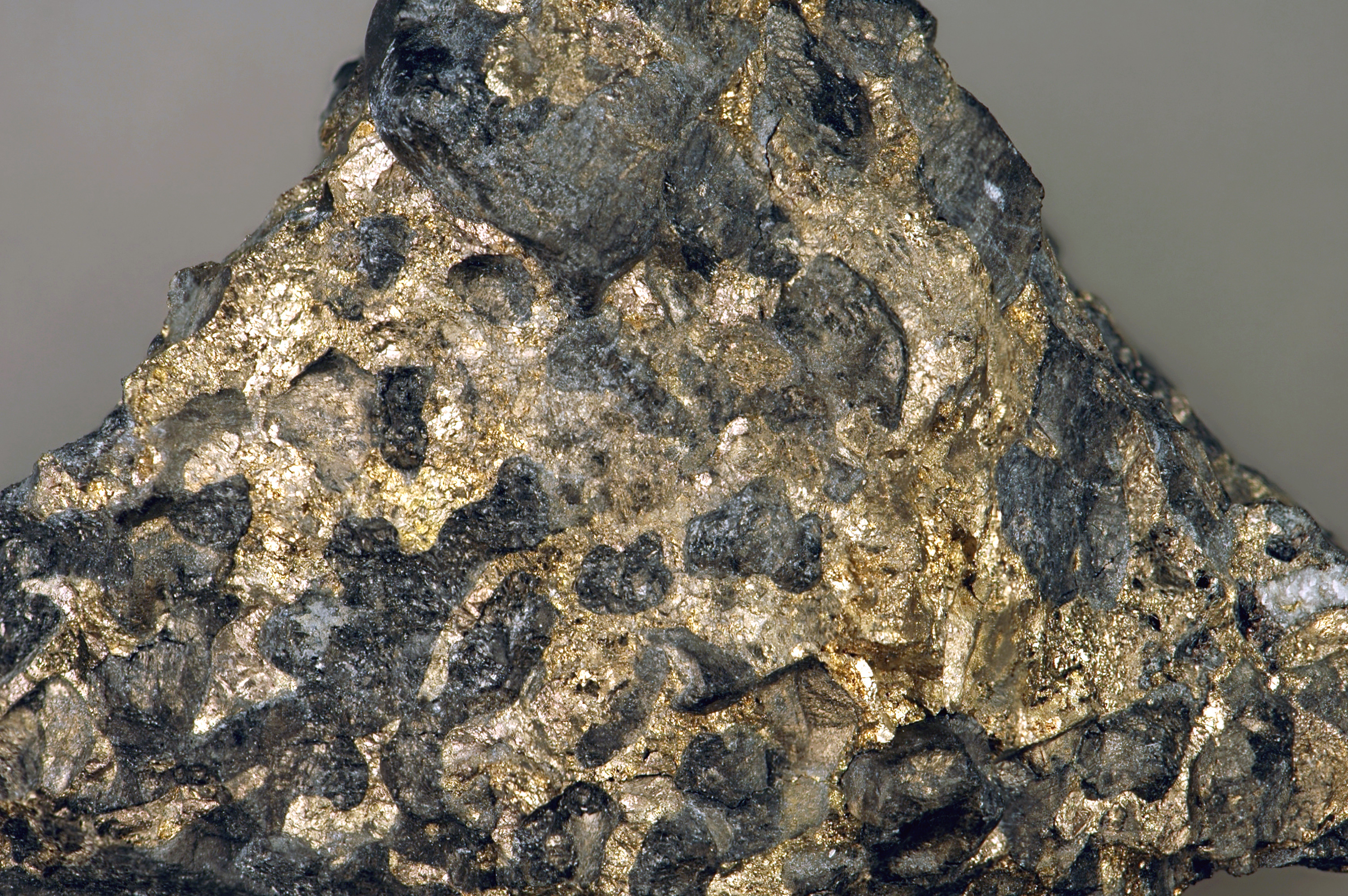
Sulfidic serpentintite (platinum-palladium ore) from the Stillwater mine in Montana

=== Palladium(0) ===
Palladium forms a range of zerovalent complexes with the formula PdL_{4}, PdL_{3} and PdL_{2}. For example, reduction of a mixture of PdCl_{2}(PPh_{3})_{2} and PPh_{3} gives tetrakis(triphenylphosphine)palladium(0):

2 PdCl_{2}(PPh_{3})_{2} + 4 PPh_{3} + 5 N_{2}H_{4} → 2 Pd(PPh_{3})_{4} + N_{2} + 4 N_{2}H_{5}^{+}Cl^{−}

Another major palladium(0) complex, tris(dibenzylideneacetone)dipalladium(0) (Pd_{2}(dba)_{3}), is prepared by reducing sodium tetrachloropalladate in the presence of dibenzylideneacetone.

Palladium(0), as well as palladium(II), are catalysts in coupling reactions, as has been recognized by the 2010 Nobel Prize in Chemistry to Richard F. Heck, Ei-ichi Negishi, and Akira Suzuki. Such reactions are widely practiced for the synthesis of fine chemicals. Prominent coupling reactions include the Heck, Suzuki, Sonogashira coupling, Stille reactions, and the Kumada coupling. Palladium(II) acetate, tetrakis(triphenylphosphine)palladium(0) (Pd(PPh_{3})_{4}), and tris(dibenzylideneacetone)dipalladium(0) (Pd_{2}(dba)_{3}) serve either as catalysts or precatalysts.

=== Other oxidation states ===
Although Pd(IV) compounds are comparatively rare, one example is sodium hexachloropalladate(IV), Na_{2}PdCl_{6}. Pd(II) and Pd(IV) can transform into each other under certain electrochemical conditions. A few compounds of palladium(III) are also known. Palladium(VI) was claimed to have been synthesized in 2002, but subsequently disproven.

Mixed valence palladium complexes exist, e.g. Pd_{4}(CO)_{4}(OAc)_{4}Pd(acac)_{2} forms an infinite Pd chain structure, with alternatively interconnected Pd_{4}(CO)_{4}(OAc)_{4} and Pd(acac)_{2} units.

When alloyed with a more electropositive element, palladium can acquire a negative charge. Such compounds are known as palladides, such as gallium palladide. Palladides with the stoichiometry RPd_{3} exist where R is scandium, yttrium, or any of the lanthanides.

== Occurrence ==
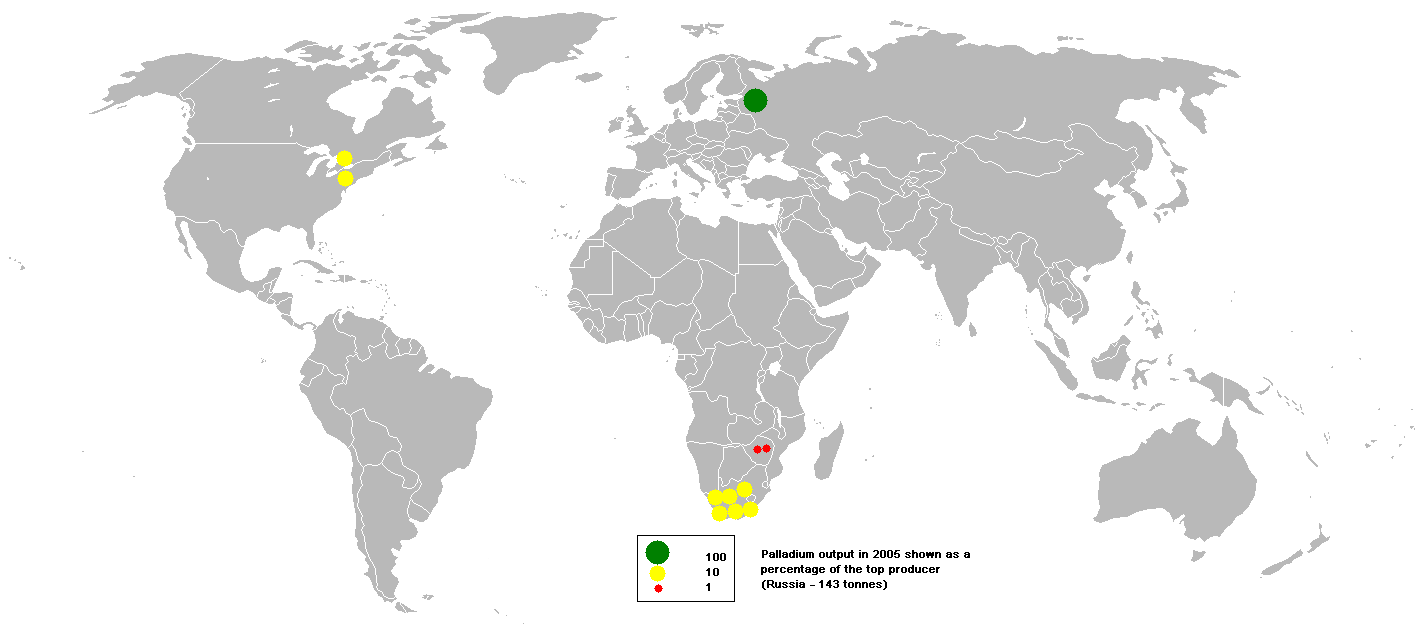
Palladium output in 2005

As overall mine production of palladium reached 210,000 kilograms in 2022, Russia was the top producer with 88,000 kilograms, followed by South Africa, Canada, the U.S., and Zimbabwe. Russia's company Norilsk Nickel ranks first among the largest palladium producers globally, accounting for 39% of the world's production.

Palladium can be found as a free metal alloyed with gold and other platinum-group metals in placer deposits of the Ural Mountains, Australia, Ethiopia, North and South America. For the production of palladium, these deposits play only a minor role. The most important commercial sources are nickel-copper deposits found in the Sudbury Basin, Ontario, and the Norilsk–Talnakh deposits in Siberia. The other large deposit is the Merensky Reef platinum group metals deposit within the Bushveld Igneous Complex South Africa. The Stillwater igneous complex of Montana and the Roby zone ore body of the Lac des Îles igneous complex of Ontario are the two other sources of palladium in Canada and the United States. Palladium is found in the rare minerals cooperite and polarite. Many more Pd minerals are known, but all of them are very rare.

Palladium is also produced in nuclear fission reactors and can be extracted from spent nuclear fuel (see synthesis of precious metals), though this source for palladium is not used. None of the existing nuclear reprocessing facilities are equipped to extract palladium from the high-level radioactive waste. A complication for the recovery of palladium in spent fuel is the presence of ^{107}Pd, a slightly radioactive long-lived fission product. Depending on end use, the radioactivity contributed by the ^{107}Pd might make the recovered palladium unusable without a costly step of isotope separation.

== Applications ==
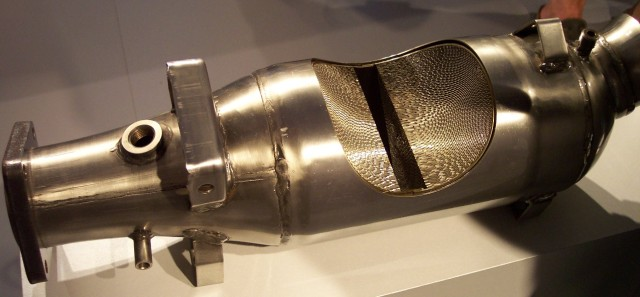
Cross-section of a metal-core catalytic converter

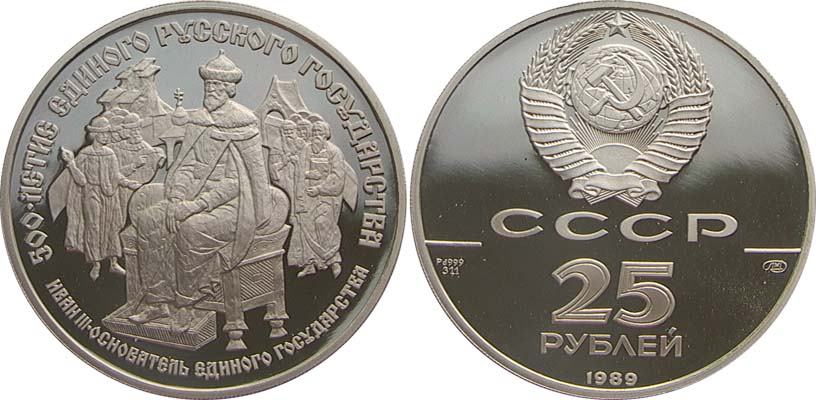
The Soviet 25-rouble commemorative palladium coin is a rare example of the monetary usage of palladium.

The largest use of palladium today is in catalytic converters. Palladium is also used in jewellery, dentistry, watch making, blood sugar test strips, aircraft spark plugs, surgical instruments, and electrical contacts. Palladium is also used to make some professional transverse (concert or classical) flutes. As a commodity, palladium bullion has ISO currency codes of XPD and 964. Palladium is one of only four metals to have such codes, the others being gold, silver and platinum. Because it adsorbs hydrogen, palladium was a key component of the controversial cold fusion experiments of the late 1980s.

=== Catalysis ===
When it is finely divided, as with palladium on carbon, palladium forms a versatile catalyst; it speeds heterogeneous catalytic processes like hydrogenation, dehydrogenation, and petroleum cracking. Palladium is also essential to the Lindlar catalyst, also called Lindlar's Palladium. A large number of carbon–carbon bonding reactions in organic chemistry are facilitated by palladium compound catalysts. For example:

- Heck reaction
- Suzuki coupling
- Tsuji-Trost reactions
- Wacker process
- Negishi reaction
- Stille coupling
- Sonogashira coupling

When dispersed on conductive materials, palladium is an excellent electrocatalyst for oxidation of primary alcohols in alkaline media. Palladium is also a versatile metal for homogeneous catalysis, used in combination with a broad variety of ligands for highly selective chemical transformations.

In 2010 the Nobel Prize in Chemistry was awarded "for palladium-catalyzed cross couplings in organic synthesis" to Richard F. Heck, Ei-ichi Negishi and Akira Suzuki. A 2008 study showed that palladium is an effective catalyst for carbon–fluorine bonds.

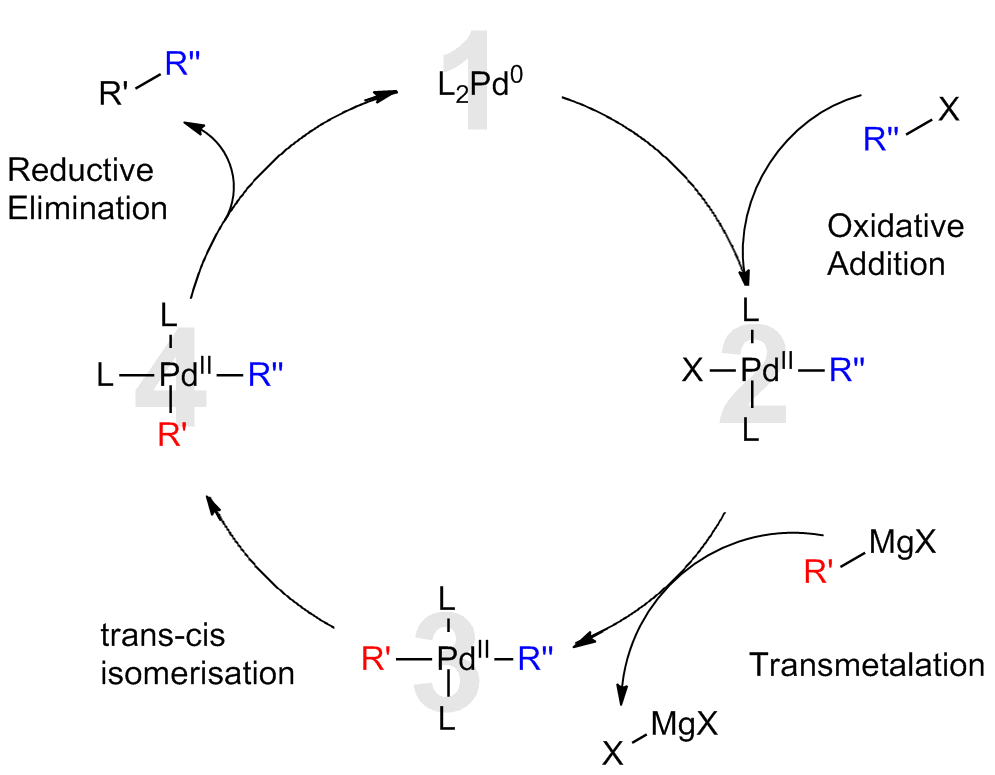
Catalytic cycle for Kumada cross coupling reaction, which is widely used in the synthesis of fine chemicals

Palladium catalysis is primarily employed in organic chemistry and industrial applications, although its use is growing as a tool for synthetic biology; in 2017, effective in vivo catalytic activity of palladium nanoparticles was demonstrated in mammals to treat disease.

Palladium is also used as a catalyst in the production of biofuels.

=== Electronics ===
The primary application of palladium in electronics is in multi-layer ceramic capacitors in which palladium (and palladium-silver alloy) is used for electrodes. Palladium (sometimes alloyed with nickel) is or can be used for component and connector plating in consumer electronics and in soldering materials. The electronic sector consumed 33 tonnes (1.07 million troy ounces) of palladium in 2006, according to a Johnson Matthey report. Palladium is used in the production of printed circuit boards.

=== Technology ===
Hydrogen easily diffuses through heated palladium, and membrane reactors with Pd membranes are used in the production of high purity hydrogen. Palladium is used in palladium-hydrogen electrodes in electrochemical studies. Palladium(II) chloride readily catalyzes carbon monoxide gas to carbon dioxide and is useful in carbon monoxide detectors.

Palladium has been used to produce metallic glass by fast cooling alloys, avoiding their crystallisation, thus reducing brittleness and leading to stronger materials.

=== Hydrogen storage ===
Palladium readily adsorbs hydrogen at room temperatures, forming palladium hydride PdH_{x} with x less than 1. While this property is common to many transition metals, palladium has a uniquely high absorption capacity and does not lose its ductility until x approaches 1. This property has been investigated in designing an efficient and safe hydrogen fuel storage medium, though palladium itself is currently prohibitively expensive for this purpose. The content of hydrogen in palladium can be linked to magnetic susceptibility, which decreases with the increase of hydrogen and becomes zero for PdH_{0.62}. At any higher ratio, the solid solution becomes diamagnetic.

Palladium is used for purification of hydrogen on a laboratory but not industrial scale.

=== Medicine ===
Palladium is used in small amounts (about 0.5%) in some alloys of dental amalgam to decrease corrosion and increase the metallic lustre of the final restoration. Palladium is also used in the production of pacemakers.

Palladium(II) complexes with C,N-chelated acyclic diaminocarbene ligands have shown nanomolar antiproliferative activity against triple-negative breast cancer, with up to 300-fold selectivity for cancer cells over normal fibroblasts. The lead compound was about 300 times more potent than cisplatin in vitro and was less acutely toxic in mice (LD₅₀ 242 mg/kg vs 15.7–18.3 mg/kg for cisplatin). In a mouse MDA-MB-231 xenograft model, it inhibited tumor growth by approximately 70%, compared with 45% for cisplatin. Its mechanism appears distinct from classical platinum alkylation.

=== Jewellery ===
Palladium has been used as a precious metal in jewellery since 1939 as an alternative to platinum in the alloys called "white gold", where the naturally white color of palladium does not require rhodium plating. Palladium, being much less dense than platinum, is similar to gold in that it can be beaten into leaf as thin as 100 nm (1/250,000 in). Unlike platinum, palladium may discolor at temperatures above 400 °C (752 °F) due to oxidation, making it more brittle and thus less suitable for use in jewellery; to prevent this, palladium intended for jewellery is heated under controlled conditions.

Prior to 2004, the principal use of palladium in jewellery was the manufacture of white gold. Palladium is one of the three most popular alloying metals in white gold (nickel and silver can also be used). Palladium-gold is more expensive than nickel-gold, but seldom causes allergic reactions (though certain cross-allergies with nickel may occur).

When platinum became a strategic resource during World War II, many jewellery bands were made out of palladium. Palladium was little used in jewellery because of the technical difficulty of casting. With the casting problem resolved the use of palladium in jewellery increased, originally because platinum increased in price whilst the price of palladium decreased. In early 2004, when gold and platinum prices rose steeply, China began fabricating volumes of palladium jewellery, consuming 37 tonnes in 2005. Subsequent changes in the relative price of platinum lowered demand for palladium to 17.4 tonnes in 2009. Demand for palladium as a catalyst has increased the price of palladium to about 50% higher than that of platinum in January 2019.

In January 2010, hallmarks for palladium were introduced by assay offices in the United Kingdom, and hallmarking became mandatory for all jewellery advertising pure or alloyed palladium. Articles can be marked as 500, 950, or 999 parts of palladium per thousand of the alloy.

=== Photography ===
In the platinotype printing process, photographers make fine-art black-and-white prints using platinum or palladium salts. Often used with platinum, palladium provides an alternative to silver. But palladium is more inert than the silver used in silver bromide prints, so such photographs are better archived than conventional prints and convey details more clearly.

== Effects on health ==
=== Toxicity ===
Palladium
Hazards
- GHS labelling
Pictograms	(GHS07: Exclamation mark)
Signal word	Warning
Hazard statements	H317
Precautionary statements	P261, P273, P280, P302+P352, P321, P333+P313, P363, P501
NFPA 704 (fire diamond)	0 0 0

Palladium is a metal with low acute toxicity (e.g. LD_{50}). Recent research on the mechanism of palladium toxicity suggests high toxicity if measured on a longer timeframe and at the cellular level in the liver and kidney. Mitochondria appear to have a key role in palladium toxicity via mitochondrial membrane potential collapse and depletion of the cellular glutathione (GSH) level. Until that recent work, it had been thought that palladium was poorly absorbed by the human body when ingested. Plants such as the water hyacinth are killed by low levels of palladium salts, but most other plants tolerate it, although tests show that, at levels above 0.0003%, growth is affected. High doses of palladium could be poisonous; tests on rodents suggest it may be carcinogenic, though until the recent research cited above, no clear evidence indicated that the element harms humans.

=== Precautions ===
Like other platinum-group metals, bulk Pd is quite inert. Although contact dermatitis has been reported, data on the effects are limited. It has been shown that people with an allergic reaction to palladium also react to nickel, making it advisable to avoid the use of dental alloys containing palladium on those so allergic.

Some palladium is emitted with the exhaust gases of cars with catalytic converters. Between 4 and 108 ng/km of palladium particulate is released by such cars, while the total uptake from food is estimated to be less than 2 μg per person a day. The second possible source of palladium is dental restoration, from which the uptake of palladium is estimated to be less than 15 μg per person per day. People working with palladium or its compounds might have a considerably greater uptake. For soluble compounds such as palladium chloride, 99% is eliminated from the body within three days.

The median lethal dose (LD_{50}) of soluble palladium compounds in mice is 200 mg/kg for oral and 5 mg/kg for intravenous administration.

== History ==
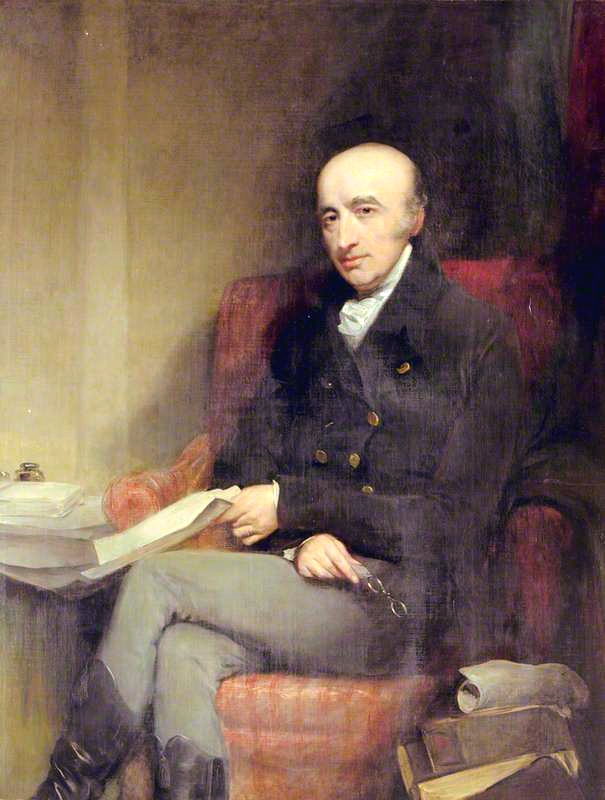
William Hyde Wollaston

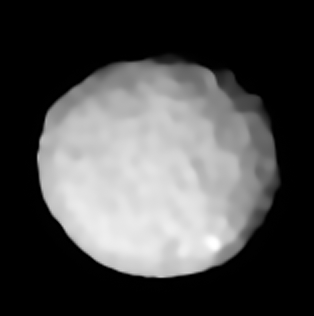
Very Large Telescope image of 2 Pallas, the asteroid after which Palladium was named.

William Hyde Wollaston noted the discovery of a new noble metal in July 1802 in his lab book and named it palladium in August of the same year. He named the element after the asteroid 2 Pallas, which had been discovered two months earlier (and which was previously considered a planet). Wollaston purified a quantity of the material and offered it, without naming the discoverer, in a small shop in Soho in April 1803. After harsh criticism from Richard Chenevix, who claimed that palladium was an alloy of platinum and mercury, Wollaston anonymously offered a reward of £20 for 20 grains of synthetic palladium alloy. Chenevix received the Copley Medal in 1803 after he published his experiments on palladium. Wollaston published the discovery of rhodium in 1804 and mentions some of his work on palladium. He disclosed that he was the discoverer of palladium in a publication in 1805.

Wollaston found palladium in crude platinum ore from South America by dissolving the ore in aqua regia, neutralizing the solution with sodium hydroxide, and precipitating platinum as ammonium chloroplatinate with ammonium chloride. He added mercuric cyanide to form the compound palladium(II) cyanide, which was heated to extract palladium metal.

Palladium chloride was at one time prescribed as a tuberculosis treatment at the rate of 0.065 g per day (approximately one milligram per kilogram of body weight). This treatment had many negative side-effects, and was later replaced by more effective drugs.

Most palladium is used for catalytic converters in the automobile industry. Catalytic converters are targets for thieves because they contain palladium and other rare metals. In the run up to year 2000, the Russian supply of palladium to the global market was repeatedly delayed and disrupted; for political reasons, the export quota was not granted on time. The ensuing market panic drove the price to an all-time high of $1,340 per troy ounce ($43/g) in January 2001. Around that time, the Ford Motor Company, fearing that automobile production would be disrupted by a palladium shortage, stockpiled the metal. When prices fell in early 2001, Ford lost nearly US$1 billion.

World demand for palladium increased from 100 tons in 1990 to nearly 300 tons in 2000. The global production of palladium from mines was 222 tonnes in 2006 according to the United States Geological Survey. Many were concerned about a steady supply of palladium in the wake of Russia's annexation of Crimea, partly as sanctions could hamper Russian palladium exports; any restrictions on Russian palladium exports could have exacerbated what was already expected to be a large palladium deficit in 2014. Those concerns pushed palladium prices to their highest level since 2001. In September 2014 they soared above the $900 per ounce mark. In 2016 however palladium cost around $614 per ounce as Russia managed to maintain stable supplies. In January 2019 palladium futures climbed past $1,344 per ounce for the first time on record, mainly due to the strong demand from the automotive industry. Palladium reached $2,024.64 per troy ounce ($65.094/g) on 6 January 2020, passing $2,000 per troy ounce the first time. The price rose above $3,000 per troy ounce in May 2021 and March 2022.

== Palladium as investment ==
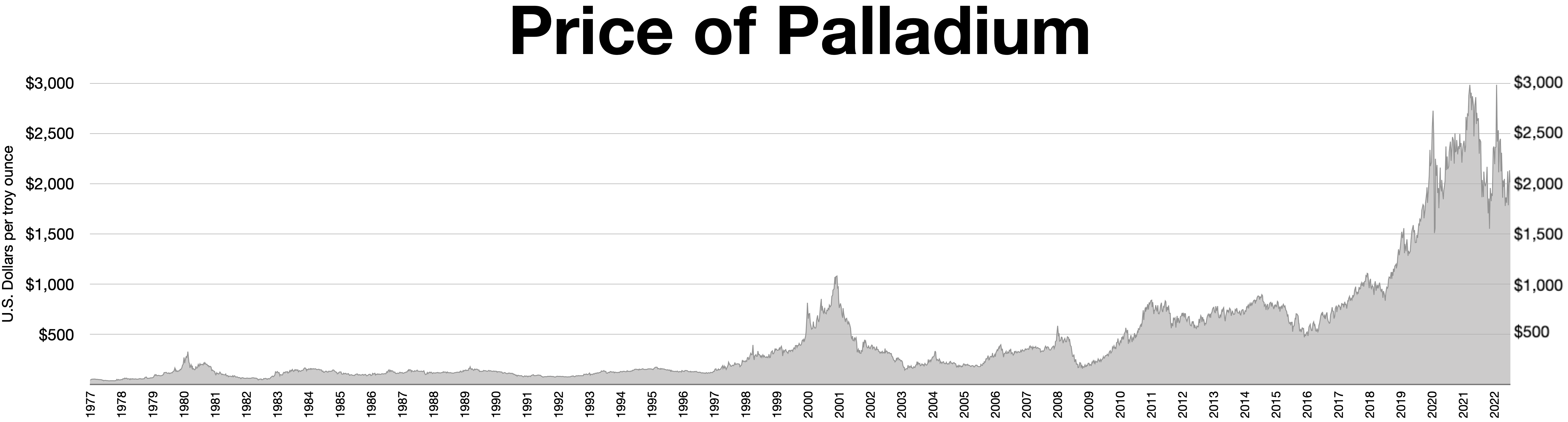
Palladium prices – US dollars per troy ounce

Global palladium sales were 8.84 million troy ounces (275 t) in 2017, of which 86% was used in the manufacturing of automotive catalytic converters, followed by industrial, jewellery, and investment usages. More than 75% of global platinum and 40% of palladium are mined in South Africa. Russia's mining company, Norilsk Nickel, produces another 44% of palladium, with US and Canada-based mines producing most of the rest.

The price for palladium reached an all-time high of $2,981.40 per troy ounce on May 3, 2021, driven mainly on speculation of the catalytic converter demand from the automobile industry. Over the following few years the price fell by over two-thirds. Palladium is traded in the spot market with the code "XPD". When settled in USD, the code is "XPDUSD". A later surplus of the metal was caused by the Russian government selling stockpiles from the Soviet era, at a rate of about 1.6 to 2 million troy ounces (50 to 62 t) a year. The amount and status of this stockpile are a state secret.

=== Palladium producers ===
- Norilsk Nickel
- Sibanye-Stillwater
- Anglo American Platinum
- Impala Platinum
- Northam Platinum

=== Exchange-traded products ===
WisdomTree Physical Palladium (LSE: PHPD) is backed by allocated palladium bullion and was the world's first palladium ETF. It is listed on the London Stock Exchange as PHPD, Xetra Trading System, Euronext and Milan. ETFS Physical Palladium Shares (NYSE: PALL) is an ETF traded on the New York Stock Exchange.

=== Bullion coins and bars ===
A traditional way of investing in palladium is buying bullion coins and bars made of palladium. Available palladium coins include the Canadian Palladium Maple Leaf, the Chinese Panda, and the American Palladium Eagle. The liquidity of direct palladium bullion investment is poorer than that of gold, platinum, and silver because there is a lower circulation of palladium coins than the big three precious metals.

== See also ==
- 2000s commodities boom
- 2020s commodities boom
- Bullion
- Bullion coin
- Inflation hedge
- Pseudo palladium
- Rare materials as an investment:
  - Silver as an investment
  - Gold as an investment
  - Platinum as an investment
  - Diamonds as an investment
