= Platinum group =

Six noble, precious metallic elements clustered together in the periodic table

'Platinum group metals' (PGMs) in the periodic table
H																		He
Li	Be												B	C	N	O	F	Ne
Na	Mg												Al	Si	P	S	Cl	Ar
K	Ca		Sc	Ti	V	Cr	Mn	Fe	Co	Ni	Cu	Zn	Ga	Ge	As	Se	Br	Kr
Rb	Sr		Y	Zr	Nb	Mo	Tc	Ru	Rh	Pd	Ag	Cd	In	Sn	Sb	Te	I	Xe
Cs	Ba	*	Lu	Hf	Ta	W	Re	Os	Ir	Pt	Au	Hg	Tl	Pb	Bi	Po	At	Rn
Fr	Ra	**	Lr	Rf	Db	Sg	Bh	Hs	Mt	Ds	Rg	Cn	Nh	Fl	Mc	Lv	Ts	Og
		*	La	Ce	Pr	Nd	Pm	Sm	Eu	Gd	Tb	Dy	Ho	Er	Tm	Yb
		**	Ac	Th	Pa	U	Np	Pu	Am	Cm	Bk	Cf	Es	Fm	Md	No
Platinum group metals
Other noble metals

The platinum-group metals (Note: Also known as the platinoids, platinides, platidises, platinum group, platinum metals, platinum family, or platinum-group elements (PGEs).) (PGMs) are six noble, precious metallic elements clustered together in the periodic table. These elements are all transition metals in the d-block (groups 8, 9, and 10, periods 5 and 6).

The six platinum-group metals are ruthenium, rhodium, palladium, osmium, iridium, and platinum. They have similar physical and chemical properties, and tend to occur together in the same mineral deposits. However, they can be further subdivided into the iridium-group platinum-group elements (IPGEs: Os, Ir, Ru) and the palladium-group platinum-group elements (PPGEs: Rh, Pt, Pd) based on their behaviour in geological systems.

The three elements above the platinum group in the periodic table (iron, nickel and cobalt) are all ferromagnetic; these, together with the lanthanide element gadolinium (at temperatures below 20 °C), are the only known transition metals that display ferromagnetism near room temperature.

== History ==
Naturally occurring platinum and platinum-rich alloys were known by pre-Columbian Americans for many years. However, even though the metal was used by pre-Columbian peoples, the first European reference to platinum appears in 1557 in the writings of the Italian humanist Julius Caesar Scaliger (1484–1558) as a description of a mysterious metal found in Central American mines between Darién (Panama) and Mexico ("up until now impossible to melt by any of the Spanish arts").

The name platinum is derived from the Spanish word platina ("little silver"), the name given to the metal by Spanish settlers in Colombia. They regarded platinum as an unwanted impurity in the silver they were mining.

By 1815, rhodium and palladium had been discovered by William Hyde Wollaston, and iridium and osmium by his close friend and collaborator Smithson Tennant.

== Properties and uses ==
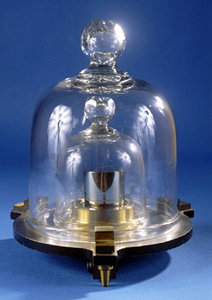
Replica of the NIST national prototype kilogram standard, made in 90% platinum, 10% iridium alloy

Significant uses of selected PGMs, 1996
PGM	Use	Thousand Toz
Palladium	autocatalysts	4470
Palladium	electronics	2070
Palladium	dental	1830
Palladium	chemical reagents	230
Platinum	jewelry	2370
Platinum	autocatalysts	1830
Rhodium	autocatalysts	490

The platinum metals have many useful catalytic properties. They are highly resistant to wear and tarnish, making platinum, in particular, well suited for fine jewellery. Other distinctive properties include resistance to chemical attack, excellent high-temperature characteristics, high mechanical strength, good ductility, and stable electrical properties. Apart from their application in jewellery, platinum metals are also used in anticancer drugs, industries, dentistry, electronics, and vehicle exhaust catalysts (VECs). VECs contain solid platinum (Pt), palladium (Pd), and rhodium (Rh) and are installed in the exhaust system of vehicles to reduce harmful emissions, such as carbon monoxide (CO), by converting them into less harmful emissions.

== Occurrence ==
Generally, ultramafic and mafic igneous rocks have relatively high, and granites low, PGE trace content. Geochemically anomalous traces occur predominantly in chromian spinels and sulfides. Mafic and ultramafic igneous rocks host practically all primary PGM ore of the world. Mafic layered intrusions, including the Bushveld Complex, outweigh by far all other geological settings of platinum deposits. Other economically significant PGE deposits include mafic intrusions related to flood basalts, and ultramafic complexes of the Alaska, Urals type.

== PGM minerals ==
Typical ores for PGMs contain ca. 10 g PGM/ton ore, thus the identity of the particular mineral is unknown.

=== Platinum ===
Platinum can occur as a native metal, but it can also occur in various different minerals and alloys. That said, Sperrylite (platinum arsenide, PtAs_{2}) ore is by far the most significant source of this metal. A naturally occurring platinum-iridium alloy, platiniridium, is found in the mineral cooperite (platinum sulfide, PtS). Platinum in a native state, often accompanied by small amounts of other platinum metals, is found in alluvial and placer deposits in Colombia, Ontario, the Ural Mountains, and in certain western American states. Platinum is also produced commercially as a by-product of nickel ore processing. The huge quantities of nickel ore processed makes up for the fact that platinum makes up only two parts per million of the ore. South Africa, with vast platinum ore deposits in the Merensky Reef of the Bushveld complex, is the world's largest producer of platinum, followed by Russia. Platinum and palladium are also mined commercially from the Stillwater igneous complex in Montana, USA. Leaders of primary platinum production are South Africa and Russia, followed by Canada, Zimbabwe and USA.

=== Osmium ===
Osmiridium is a naturally occurring alloy of iridium and osmium found in platinum-bearing river sands in the Ural Mountains and in North and South America. Trace amounts of osmium also exist in nickel-bearing ores found in the Sudbury, Ontario, region along with other platinum group metals. Even though the quantity of platinum metals found in these ores is small, the large volume of nickel ores processed makes commercial recovery possible.

=== Iridium ===
Metallic iridium is found with platinum and other platinum group metals in alluvial deposits. Naturally occurring iridium alloys include osmiridium and iridosmine, both of which are mixtures of iridium and osmium. It is recovered commercially as a by-product from nickel mining and processing.

=== Ruthenium ===
Ruthenium is generally found in ores with the other platinum group metals in the Ural Mountains and in North and South America. Small but commercially important quantities are also found in pentlandite extracted from Sudbury, Ontario, and in pyroxenite deposits in South Africa.

=== Rhodium ===
The industrial extraction of rhodium is complex, because it occurs in ores mixed with other metals such as palladium, silver, platinum, and gold. It is found in platinum ores and obtained free as a white inert metal which is very difficult to fuse. Principal sources of this element are located in South Africa, Zimbabwe, in the river sands of the Ural Mountains, North and South America, and also in the copper-nickel sulfide mining area of the Sudbury Basin region. Although the quantity at Sudbury is very small, the large amount of nickel ore processed makes rhodium recovery cost effective. However, the annual world production in 2003 of this element is only 7 or 8 tons and there are very few rhodium minerals.

=== Palladium ===
Palladium is preferentially hosted in sulfide minerals, primarily in pyrrhotite. Palladium is found as a free metal and alloyed with platinum and gold with platinum group metals in placer deposits of the Ural Mountains of Eurasia, Australia, Ethiopia, South and North America. However it is commercially produced from nickel-copper deposits found in South Africa and Ontario, Canada. The huge volume of nickel-copper ore processed makes this extraction profitable in spite of its low concentration in these ores.

== Production ==
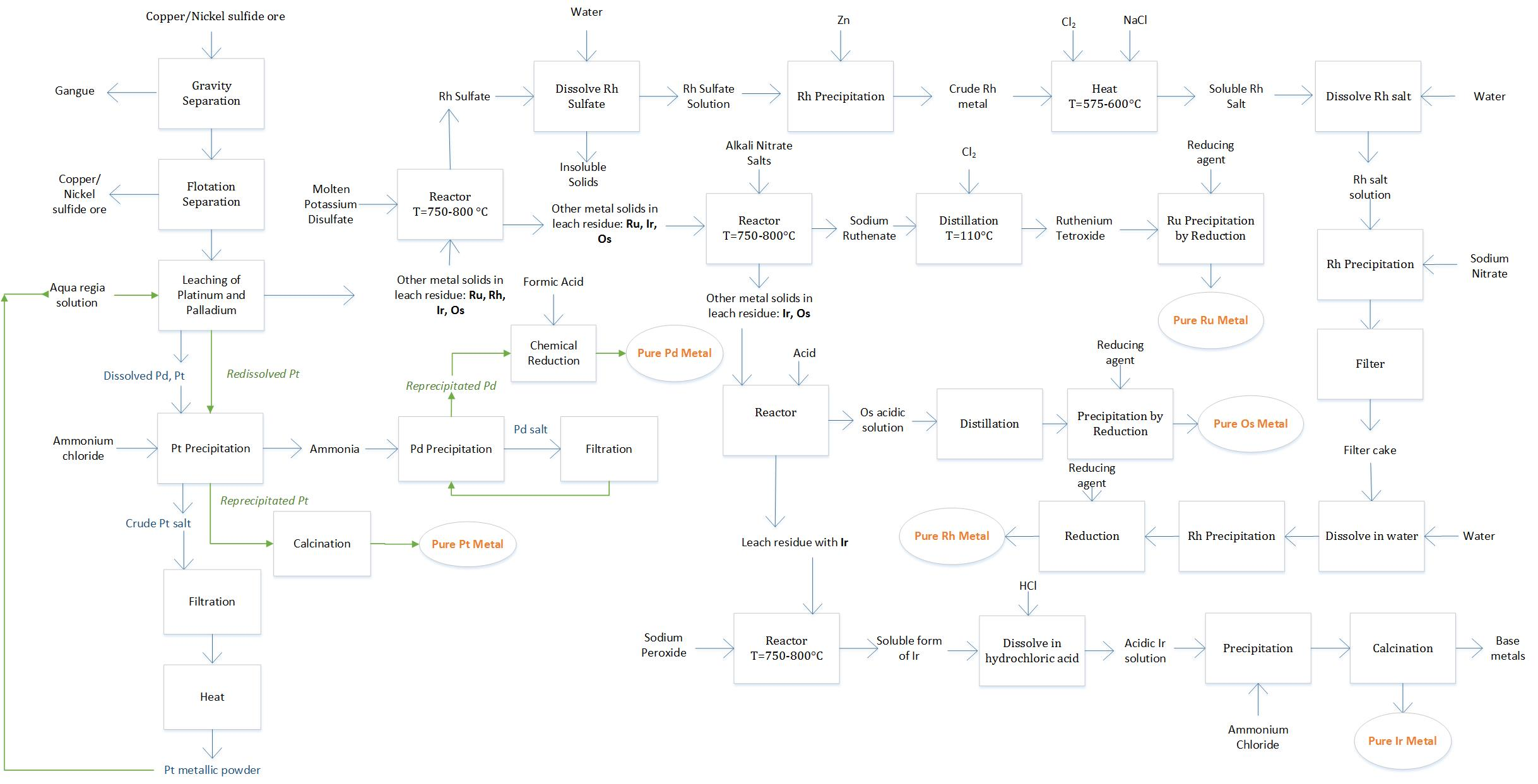
Process flow diagram for the separation of the platinum group metals.

The production of individual platinum group metals normally starts from residues of the production of other metals with a mixture of several of those metals. Purification typically starts with the anode residues of gold, copper, or nickel production. This results in a very energy intensive extraction process, which leads to environmental consequences. Carbon dioxide emissions are expected to rise as a result of increased demand for platinum metals and there is likely to be expanded mining activity in the Bushveld Igneous Complex because of this. Further research is needed to determine the environmental impacts. Classical purification methods exploit differences in chemical reactivity and solubility of several compounds of the metals under extraction. These approaches have yielded to new technologies that utilize solvent extraction.

Separation begins with dissolution of the sample. If aqua regia is used, the chloride complexes are produced. Depending on the details of the process, which are often trade secrets, the individual PGMs are obtained as the following compounds: the poorly soluble (NH_{4})_{2}IrCl_{6} and (NH_{4})_{2}PtCl_{6}, PdCl_{2}(NH_{3})_{2}, the volatile OsO_{4} and RuO_{4}, and [RhCl(NH_{3})_{5}]Cl_{2}.

=== Production in nuclear reactors ===
Significant quantities of the three light platinum group metals—ruthenium, rhodium and palladium—are formed as fission products in nuclear reactors. With escalating prices and increasing global demand, reactor-produced noble metals are emerging as an alternative source. Various reports are available on the possibility of recovering fission noble metals from spent nuclear fuel.

== Environmental concerns ==
It was previously thought that platinum group metals had very few negative attributes in comparison to their distinctive properties and their ability to reduce harmful emission from automobile exhausts. However, even with all the positives of platinum metal use, its possible future harm should be considered. Metallic Pt is considered not chemically reactive and non-allergenic, so that Pt emitted from VECs in metallic and oxide forms is considered relatively safe. However, Pt can solubilise in road dust, enter water sources, the ground, and increase dose rates in animals through bioaccumulation. These impacts from platinum groups were previously not considered, however over time the accumulation of platinum group metals in the environment may actually pose more of a risk than previously thought. As more internal combustion cars are driven, platinum metal emissions increase.

The bioaccumulation of PGMs in animals can pose a health risk to both humans and biodiversity. Species whose food source is contaminated by these hazardous PGMs emitted from VECs may accumulate them, as may the species that consume them, including humans.

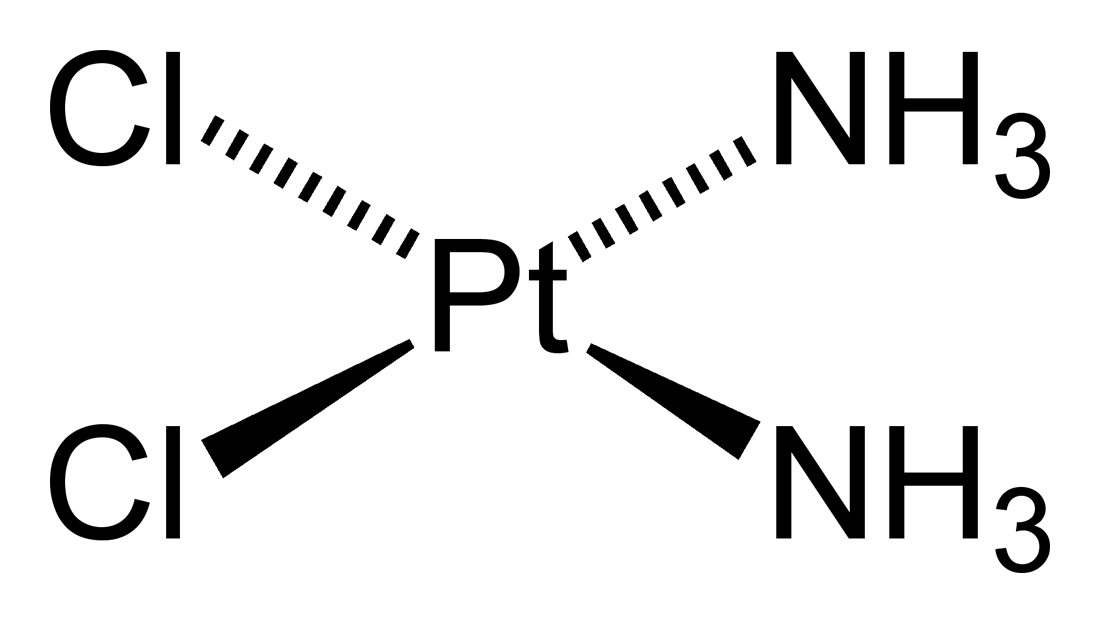
Cisplatin is a platinum-based drug used in therapy of human neoplasms. The medical success of cisplatin is compromised by potentially severe side effects.

Platinum metals extracted during the mining and smelting process can also cause environmental damage. In Zimbabwe, platinum-group mining caused pollution in water sources, acidic water drainage, and environmental degradation.

Another hazard of Pt is being exposed to halogenated Pt salts, which can cause allergic reactions leading to high rates of asthma and dermatitis. This response is sometimes seen in workers employed in production of industrial catalysts. Workers removed immediately from further contact with Pt salts showed no evidence of long-term effects, however continued exposure could lead to health effects.

Platinum use in drugs also may need to be reevaluated, as some of the side effects to these drugs include nausea, hearing loss, and nephrotoxicity. Handling of these drugs by medical personal also led to side effects including chromosome aberrations and hair loss. The long-term medical effects of platinum drug use and exposure await evaluation.

While exposure to relatively low volumes of platinum group metal emissions may not have long-term health effects, it is unknown how the accumulation of Pt metal emissions will affect the environment as well as human health, what levels of risk are safe, and how potential hazards from platinum-group metals can be mitigated.

== See also ==
- Platinum group metals in Africa
- Merensky Reef
- Johnson Matthey Technology Review (formerly published as Platinum Metals Review)
