= Association of Mineworkers and Construction Union =

Trade union in South Africa

AMCU
- Association of Mineworkers and Construction Union
- Founded: 1998
- Headquarters: eMalahleni, formerly Witbank
- Location: South Africa
- Members: 250,000
- Key people: Joseph Mathunjwa; Founder and President, Jeffrey Mphahlele; general secretary, Jimmy Gama; national treasurer, Dumisani Nkalitshane; national organiser
- Website: www.amcu.co.za

The Association of Mineworkers and Construction Union (AMCU) was formed in Mpumalanga, South Africa, in 1998 as a breakaway faction of the COSATU-affiliated National Union of Mineworkers (NUM). It was formally registered as a union in 2001. According to Mining Weekly, the union sees itself as distinct from NUM in that it is "apolitical and noncommunist".

Competition with NUM over bargaining rights, especially at the Impala Platinum and Lonmin mines in the Rustenburg area culminated in the violent Marikana miners' strike and what became known as the Marikana Massacre on 16 August 2012, in which police shot and killed over 30 strikers.

In 2013, AMCU represented over 70% of Lonmin employees, compared to the 20% representation of the NUM. It is also the majority union at Anglo American Platinum (Amplats) and Impala Platinum.

In 2024, as a result of a resolution of the 2023 Special National Congress, the Labour Party was formed.

== See also ==
- The rise and rise of Amcu, by Jan de Lange, Miningmx, 2 August 2012
- The Marikana action is a strike by the poor against the state and the haves, Justice Malala, The Guardian, 17 August 2012
- No angels in bloody SA mine clashes, Terry Bell, Terry Bell Writes, 15 August 2012
