= Marikana massacre =

2012 killing of striking miners by police in Wonderkop, North West, South Africa

Lonmin Strike
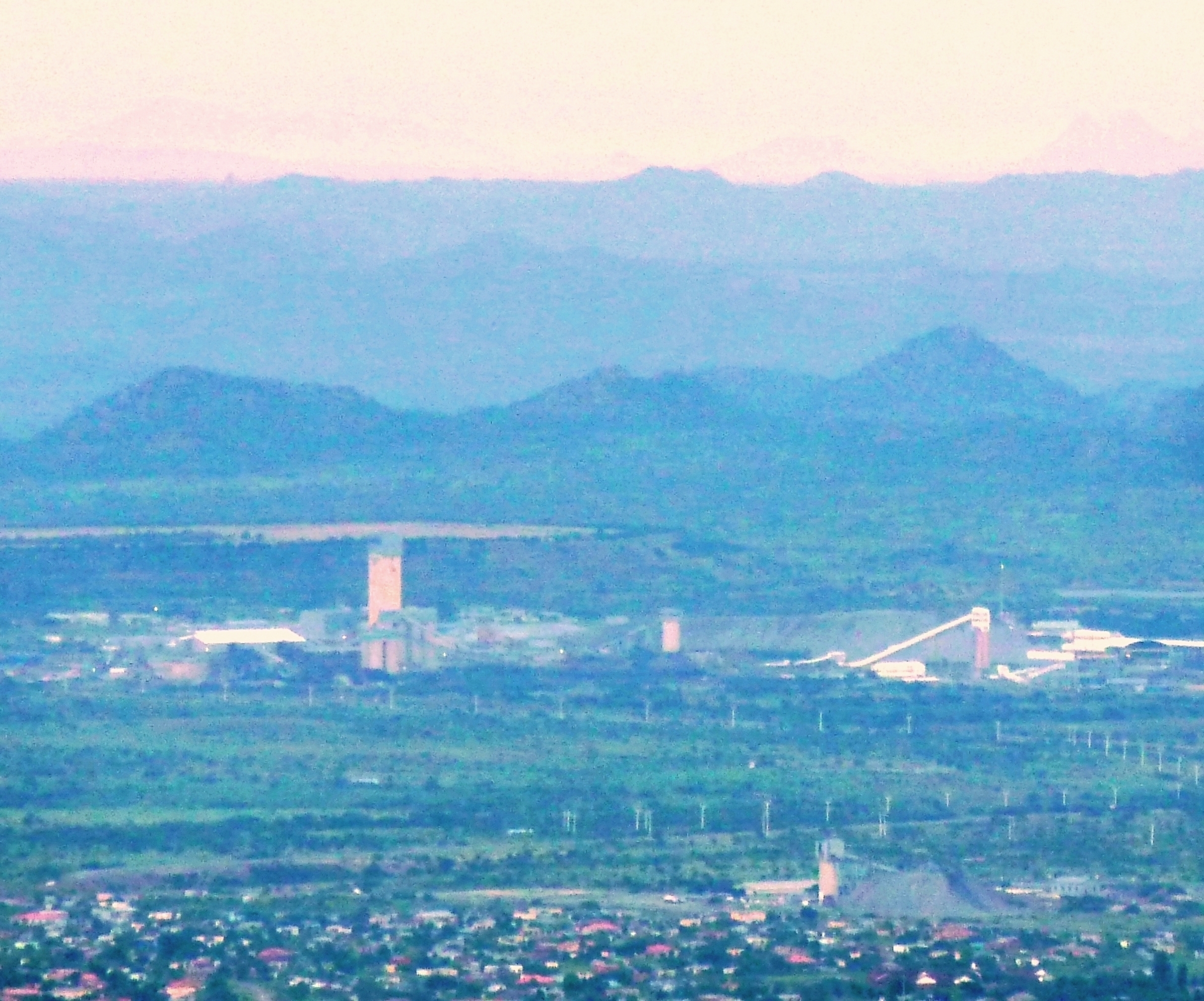
- The EPC section of Lonmin Platinum, with Bapong in the foreground
- Date: 10 August 2012 – 20 September 2012
- Location: Lonmin Marikana mine Marikana, Rustenburg; North West, South Africa
- Result: 11–22% wage increase

Parties
Association of Mineworkers and Construction Union Unaffiliated miners National Union of Mineworkers	Lonmin private security South African Police Service

Casualties and losses
12–14 August: 6 mineworkers dead 16 August: 34 mineworkers dead (78 mineworkers injured) Total: 40 deaths 78 injured	12–14 August: 2 policemen, 2 security guards dead

The Marikana massacre was the killing of thirty-four miners by the South African Police Service (SAPS) on 16 August 2012 during a six-week wildcat strike at the Lonmin platinum mine at Marikana near Rustenburg in South Africa's North West province. The massacre constituted the most lethal use of force by South African security forces against civilians since the Soweto uprising in 1976 and has been compared to the 1960 Sharpeville massacre.

The massacre occurred on the seventh day of an unauthorized wildcat strike at the mine which was launched without the endorsement of the National Union of Mineworkers (NUM). The strikers sought a wage increase to be negotiated outside the existing collective wage agreement. Early reports suggested that they had been encouraged by the Association of Mineworkers and Construction Union (AMCU). When the NUM refused to represent their demands and Lonmin refused to meet with them, the mineworkers launched the strike on 10 August 2012. On 11 August, senior representatives of the NUM opened fire on the strikers as they marched towards the NUM's office; two wounded strikers were wrongly reported killed, vastly heightening tensions.

Between 12 August and 14 August, violence escalated among the strikers, the SAPS, and private security officers employed by Lonmin. During this period, ten people were killed. Five of them – three strikers and two SAPS members – were killed in a single confrontation on 13 August. In addition, two Lonmin security officers were killed on 12 August, and three other Lonmin mine employees were killed in isolated incidents for which strikers are presumed to be responsible. Failed attempts to negotiate a peaceful resolution were launched by SAPS and the leadership of both AMCU and the NUM.

The massacre on 16 August was the result of the decision by SAPS forcibly to disperse the striking mineworkers, who throughout the week had gathered on a public koppie (Afrikaans for a small hilltop) neighbouring the mine. The shooting took place at two locations, with 17 people fatally wounded at each location. The official figure for strikers injured during the shooting is 78.

The Lonmin strike ended on 18 September with a wage agreement securing an 11 to 22 percent wage increase for workers. The strikers returned to work on 20 September. In the interim, however, similar wildcat strikes were initiated at other mines across South Africa. This wave of strikes led President Jacob Zuma to deploy the national military to the platinum-mining belt in mid-September and collectively made 2012 the most protest-filled year in the country since the end of apartheid.

In the aftermath of the massacre, 270 Lonmin mineworkers were arrested and charged with the murder of their colleagues on 16 August; the charges were ultimately dropped amid public outcry. An official commission of inquiry, chaired by retired judge Ian Farlam, concluded its investigation in 2015 but was ambivalent in assigning blame for the massacre, criticising the police's strategy and actions but also criticising the conduct of the strikers, unions, and mine management.

== Background ==
=== NUM–AMCU rivalry ===
The Marikana strike occurred against a backdrop of antagonism between the National Union of Mineworkers (NUM) and its emerging rival, the Association of Mineworkers and Construction Union (AMCU). The NUM was the largest affiliate of the Congress of South African Trade Unions (Cosatu), which in turn was allied with South Africa's ruling party, the African National Congress (ANC), and has contributed many of the ANC's senior leaders. According to the Guardian, the NUM's popularity had begun to decline under general secretary Frans Baleni, partly because of the NUM's perceived closeness to government and to management, which in some cases led members to believe that the union accepted unfair wage settlements that tied workers into years of insufficient wage increases. AMCU, on the other hand, was founded by Joseph Mathunjwa after he fell out with the NUM in 1998. In the months and years ahead of the Marikana strike, AMCU had begun to compete with the NUM for members and bargaining rights, especially in South Africa's platinum mines – the NUM's platinum sector had, during Baleni's tenure, become increasingly alienated from the NUM mainstream. In January and February 2012, a six-week strike at the Impala Platinum mine in Rustenberg, North West Province turned acrimonious when the NUM accused AMCU of fuelling the strike to gain members; four people died in the ensuing violence.

The strike that occasioned the massacre was held at the Marikana mine, a platinum mine in Marikana, Rustenberg, not far from the Impala mine where the earlier violence occurred. The mine was operated by Lonmin, the world's third-largest platinum producer. NUM's dominance in Lonmin mines had faltered in the preceding years: its membership had declined from 66 percent of Lonmin workers to 49 percent, and it had therefore lost its exclusive organizing rights in the mines. Simultaneously, AMCU's support had shot up to roughly 20 per cent of Lonmin workers.

=== Worker grievances ===
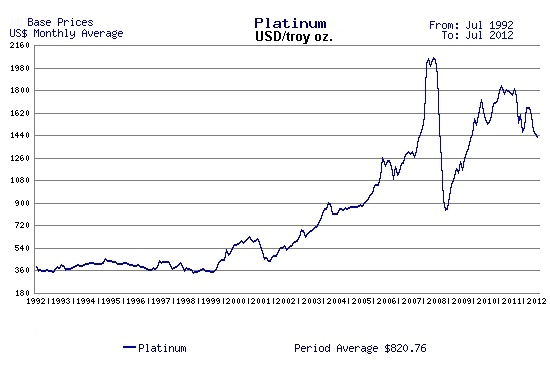
Average price of platinum from 1992 to 2012, in US$ per troy ounce (~$20/g)

The strike at Marikana was driven by rock drill operators, who of all mineworkers typically work in some of the most dangerous conditions underground. Lonmin employed about 4,100 such operators. The rock drillers sought a three-fold wage increase, from R4,000 a month to R12,500 a month, notwithstanding the fact that the prevailing collective wage agreement was not due to expire until 2013. At least some of the strikers were inspired by the wage increases that had been obtained by rock drillers at the Impala mine strike earlier that year (from R4,000 to R9,500). Some were reportedly encouraged by the fact that, in July 2012, Lonmin had agreed to grant a housing allowance increase to miners following an unprotected strike, suggesting that the mine was willing to negotiate outside of the collective wage agreement. However, it was also reported that AMCU had promised the Marikana strikers that the R12,500 wage was attainable – and thus, in the Guardian's phrase, had "dangled a fat piece of fruit in front of the workers' eyes". AMCU president Mathunjwa confirmed that the strike was a response to poor pay: "As long as bosses and senior management are getting fat cheques, that's good for them. And these workers are subjected to poverty for life." However, on 17 August – after the massacre – he denied that AMCU had promised workers that it could negotiate a R12,500 wage.

In the aftermath of the strike and massacre, commentators turned their attention to broader conditions in the mining industry which could have contributed to the workers' grievances and to the volatile environment during the strike. Al Jazeera said that the strike took place amid "seething tensions" in the mine, as a result of "dire living conditions, union rivalry, and company disinterest". The Bench Marks Foundation argued that a key trigger of the violence had been the exploitation of the mineworkers: "The benefits of mining are not reaching the workers or the surrounding communities. Lack of employment opportunities for local youth, squalid living conditions, unemployment and growing inequalities contribute to this mess." Rob Davies, South Africa's Minister of Trade and Industry, described the conditions in the mines as "appalling" and said that mine owners who "make millions" had questions to answer about how they treat their workers. The International Labour Organisation agreed, saying that workers in mines such as Marikana were frequently "exposed to a variety of safety hazards: falling rocks, exposure to dust, intensive noise, fumes and high temperatures, among others".

== Initial strike: 10–16 August ==
The massacre took place on the periphery of Wonderkop, near Marikana, North West Province.

=== Strike begins: 10 August ===
On Wednesday 8 August 2012, a group of rock drill operators from various Lonmin mines had a mass meeting where they agreed on their demand for a significant salary increase, though the NUM leaders present at the meeting refused to support the demand. The following day was a public holiday, Women's Day, and another rock drillers' meeting was held at the Lonmin-owned football stadium which bordered the workers' accommodation in Wonderkop; attendees agreed to approach the Lonmin management directly, as the NUM refused to represent them.

On 10 August, workers at the Marikana mine assembled and marched (toyi-toyi'd) to the offices of Lonmin management. Lonmin refused to meet with them, instructing them to consult with their NUM leadership, and, in response, 3,000 workers walked off the job. This initiated an illegal wildcat strike, designed to achieve the strikers' desired wage increase to R12,500. According to sources interviewed by the Daily Maverick, the instigators of the strike were largely NUM members, but "came together as workers, not as a union" and held the strike without any union representation. Testifying later, witnesses disagreed about whether the gatherings on 10 August had been peaceful or whether attendees had displayed aggression towards Lonmin management.

Little reported on at the time were clashes on the evening of 10 August between the strikers and private security officials employed by Lonmin. According to Lonmin and NUM officials, there was widespread intimidation of workers who wished to report for duty instead of joining the strike. On at least three occasions during the evening of 10 August, Lonmin security officers fired rubber bullets into crowds of strikers, who they said were armed with traditional weapons, including knobkerries and spears. Two miners were injured by gunshots and filed criminal charges for attempted murder, but subsequent investigation did not establish whether they had been hit with live ammunition or only by rubber bullets. The South African Police Service (SAPS) was summoned by Lonmin during the unrest on the evening of 10 August and later testified that on that day it formulated a contingency plan which would allow it to conduct policing in the case of prolonged or hostile strike action.

=== Clash with the NUM: 11 August ===
Early in the morning on Saturday 11 August, the strikers – still primarily NUM-affiliated rock drill operators – marched to the main offices of the NUM in Wonderkop, where they intended to present a memorandum to their NUM branch leaders (who are elected representatives, senior to shop stewards, paid a bonus by the mine for their union work). The memorandum formally requested that the NUM should represent the strikers in their demand for a R12,500 wage. However, according to strikers and other witnesses, once the march was about 100 or 150 metres away from the NUM office, somewhere in the vicinity of the Wonderkop taxi rank, some 15 to 20 NUM representatives – wielding between five and 15 firearms among them – emerged from the office and opened fire on the protestors, using live ammunition and apparently without warning or provocation.

In later investigations, the NUM representatives did not dispute that at least some of them had opened fire on the protestors, but they claimed that the protestors were armed with traditional weapons, threw stones and shouted threats as they approached, and provided no indication that they hoped to speak peacefully with NUM leadership. Indeed, the NUM representatives had heard a rumour that the protestors intended to set alight the NUM office, and therefore believed themselves to be acting in self-defence. This account was contradicted by strikers, who claimed that they had armed themselves, precisely for the purpose of self-defence, only after the confrontation at the NUM offices. There was also some confusion about casualties incurred during the confrontation. The Daily Maverick reported in 2012, based on interviews with sources, that two protestors – both rock drillers and NUM members – had been killed by gunfire. This claim was later repeated. However, the official investigation later found that two protestors had been shot by NUM representatives but had survived.

Following the clash outside the NUM offices, the strikers dispersed and later reassembled at Lonmin's football stadium. There, they decided for their safety to move their meetings to the nearby koppie (Afrikaans for a small hilltop), which was located on public land and easily accessible from the various Lonmin mines in the area and from the Marikana and Wonderkop settlements. The koppie became the primary staging ground for confrontations in the week ahead. According to the Guardian's sources, it was on the afternoon of 11 August that other Lonmin miners joined the rock drill operators in their strike, infuriated by the NUM's response to the protest and by what they viewed as NUM collusion with Lonmin. Sources also told the Guardian that attendees at the afternoon gathering collected cash to enlist a sangoma, a traditional healer, to protect them from violence.

=== Further violence: 12–15 August ===
Over the next few days, SAPS drastically increased its presence in Marikana, deploying additional members from other provinces. According to SAPS figures, there were 209 SAPS members at Marikana on 13 August; this increased to 532 members on 14 August, 689 members on 15 August, and, finally, 718 members on 16 August. The additional deployments accompanied a marked escalation in the violence. Despite conflicting reports at the time and in the following months, subsequent investigation suggested that at least ten people were killed at Marikana between 12 and 14 August: three mineworkers and two policemen in a single altercation; and, in other confrontations, an additional three Lonmin mine employees and two Lonmin security officials.

==== Confrontations with Lonmin security: 12 August ====
On 12 August, there were at least three violent confrontations between strikers and Lonmin security. First, a scuffle ensued during a march of strikers from the koppie to the Lonmin management office, apparently precipitated by a rock thrown at security officers by one striker and inflamed when the security officers opened fire with rubber bullets. Many of the strikers were, by this point, armed, including with pangas, and security officers were injured during their retreat. A second confrontation occurred at a mineworkers' hostel, where two Lonmin security officers – Hassan Fundi and Frans Mabelane – were killed, presumably by strikers. And a third took place at the K4 shaft of Marikana mine, where workers attempting to enter the mine to work were assaulted and seriously injured, and one worker, Thapelo Eric Mabebe, was killed. Several vehicles were also burned. The official investigation later condemned the K4 incident as "an unprovoked attack on unarmed persons... to enforce the strike with intimidation". Another mineworker, Julius Langa, was stabbed to death in the early hours of 13 August, again presumably by strikers.

==== Confrontation with SAPS: 13 August ====
On the day of 13 August, the first bloody confrontation between strikers and police occurred, though, despite police video of the incident, the exact course of events is not clear. It is generally accepted that a small group of some 100 to 200 strikers had marched from the koppie towards the K3 shaft, where they had heard that some employees were still at work. Once informed by Lonmin security that the shaft was empty, the strikers turned back to the koppie, but were intercepted, near the railway line, by a police contingent. Video footage shows Major-General William Mpembe, the deputy provincial police commissioner for North West province, attempting to negotiate with the strikers, who he demanded should disarm – they were carrying sticks and pangas – before being allowed to rejoin the group on the koppie. In the recorded exchange, the strikers refused to disarm, saying that their intentions were not violent but that they needed the weapons to protect themselves from the NUM. The group's leader beseeched the police, "Please open the way for us. That's the only thing we are asking for. We are not fighting with anyone. We just want to go to the koppie." The strikers and police then reached an agreement that the police would escort the strikers to the koppie, where they would hand over their weapons.

However, moments later – shortly after the police video cut out – a scuffle broke out. The Guardian implied that Mbembe appeared, in the video, to change his mind after taking a phone call; while Mbembe himself testified that the strikers had charged the police, though further video footage later emerged which appeared to contradict this. In the ensuing chaos, at least one tear gas canister and one stun grenade were fired by police, although there is dispute as to whether Mbembe had ordered this action. According to police records, at least three police officers (one wielding a pistol and the two others with R5 assault rifles) fired at least 37 rounds between them. Two warrant officers, Hendrick Monene and Sello Lepaaku, were killed, as were three mineworkers on or near the scene: Phumzile Sokhanyile, Semi Jokanisi, and Thembelakhe Mati. Another officer was critically injured and was airlifted to hospital. According to the Guardian, on the night of 13 August, police officers across the country circulated photographs of the brutalised bodies of the dead officers; the strikers' lawyers later claimed that the incident gave SAPS members a "revenge motive" which infected events in subsequent days. In the years after the strike, two separate murder trials began in relation to the incident: one concerning the officers' deaths and the other the mineworkers' deaths, with police officers accused, in particular, of deliberately "hunting down" and killing Sokhanyile after he fled the scene.

==== Negotiations on the koppie: 14–15 August ====
On the evening of 13 August, the police had made a decision to attempt to negotiate a peaceful resolution with the strikers, who were still occupying the koppie. Lieutenant Colonel Stephen James McIntosh, a trained hostage negotiator, arrived at the koppie in the early afternoon on 14 August. He later recounted that there had been between 4,000 and 5,000 strikers on the koppie, many of them armed with traditional or homemade weapons, and many of them "rowdy and aggressive". After McIntosh addressed the crowd from a loudspeaker, five representatives of the strikers approached his armoured vehicle in order to negotiate with the SAPS officers. They spoke in Fanagalo, with a Lonmin employee interpreting for the police. The strikers reiterated to McIntosh that the strike was about wages, that they were on the koppie because the NUM had attacked them on 10 August, and that they demanded to speak to Lonmin management. At about 5 p.m. on 14 August, the police negotiators were informed that a corpse had been found around the back of the koppie. It was the body of Isiah Twala, a Lonmin supervisor, whom some of the strikers accused of being an impimpi (informer). The strikers' representatives agreed to let police land a helicopter near the koppie in order to conduct investigations on the scene.

At this point, Lonmin management believed the strike to have been driven by AMCU and its support for the R12,500 wage demand – a claim later retracted. However, at the time, that belief also circulated in the media, which reproduced the narrative that the ongoing violence at Marikana was the result of rivalry between AMCU and NUM. Also on 14 August, NUM general secretary Baleni denied this, saying that NUM was a victim of AMCU in the violence. At the same time he expressed alarm that "the escalating violence has been allowed to continue unabated by the law enforcement agencies" and called for the deployment of a special task force or the military to "deal decisively with the criminal elements in Rustenberg and its surrounding mine". AMCU vice-president Jeff Mthahmeme, in response, denied that the NUM was a victim, accusing NUM members of being "the perpetrators of this violence" and of having led to the deaths of two AMCU members. In the telling of AMCU president Mathunjwa, the miners occupying the koppie were primarily disgruntled NUM leaders, who had lost faith in their union representatives: "It's possible that AMCU members were there but it's not AMCU that coordinated the protest on the mountain".

According to Mathunjwa, he and other AMCU leaders became involved in the strike not because it had promised the strikers to negotiate the wage increase, but because it had been asked, on 13 August, to intervene in the standoff, even though it did not officially represent the workers involved. Indeed, negotiations between SAPS and the strikers were to resume on the morning of 15 August, and Mathunjwa made himself available to assist. On 15 August, he and NUM president Senzeni Zokwana appeared together on Xolani Gwala's Forum at 8, a morning radio programme broadcast on SAFM shortly after the 8 a.m. news. At the end of the programme, Zokwana and Mathunjwa agreed to go together to Marikana to speak to the strikers and urge them to return to work. Both union leaders addressed the crowd on the koppie through loudspeakers, from inside armoured vehicles – in a video, Mathunjwa is seen objecting to this arrangement, saying "These are people and we are a union. We are not afraid of them, we have done nothing wrong". The strikers refused to listen to Zokwana – who later said that the strikers did not trust the NUM and would never have wanted its involvement in negotiations – but Mathunjwa was able to address them. However, according to the Daily Maverick, Mathunjwa's attempts to mediate between the strikers and management were stymied by the refusal of Lonmin and the police to accede to the strikers' demand that Lonmin management address them directly. Indeed, Lonmin had that morning reiterated its insistence that it would engage with its employees only through the official structures "in a very safe environment where there are no weapons. Not on the mountain".

==== Police decision to disarm miners: 15 August ====
On 14 August, SAPS members had met with Lonmin management, and North West Police Commissioner Zukiswa Mbombo had proposed that Lonmin should issue an ultimatum to its workers to return to work; SAPS would then attempt to encircle the strikers on the koppie and offer them a chance to lay down their weapons and leave the koppie one by one. In the conversation, which was recorded, Mbombo said that if the strikers did not surrender their arms the following day, "it is blood". However, she also said, "I do not want a situation where 20 people are dead. This is not what we are here for." However, the following day, the visit of the union leaders to Marikana led SAPS to postpone taking strong action against the strikers.

Later on 15 August, an "extraordinary session" of the SAPS National Management Forum was held in Midrand, Gauteng, and endorsed a new strategy: if the plan to encircle the strikers and have them voluntarily disarm and disperse failed, SAPS would forcibly disarm and remove them from the koppie. This contingency, the so-called "tactical option", therefore was pre-arranged and was not – contrary to initial suggestions – only formulated on the ground on the afternoon of 16 August when events on the koppie escalated.

ANC stalwart Cyril Ramaphosa, who was a former NUM leader and in 2012 was a member of the Lonmin board, was criticised for failing to advocate for the workers' interests. Instead, emails he had written during the strike – later released publicly – were interpreted as showing that he had argued for the police to intervene. On 15 August, he wrote to Lonmin's chief commercial director, "The terrible events that have unfolded cannot be described as a labour dispute. They are plainly dastardly criminal and must be characterised as such... There needs to be concomitant action to address this situation." In another email, he wrote that, "the Minister [Susan Shabangu, Minister of Mineral Resources] and indeed all government officials need to understand that we are essentially dealing with a criminal act". In May 2017, Ramaphosa – by then Deputy President of South Africa – apologised for the phrasing of the emails.

== Massacre: 16 August ==
=== Events in the morning ===
On the morning of 16 August, the SAPS operational command held a meeting at which they referred to the day ahead as "D-Day", suggesting that they were prepared to enforce the so-called tactical option. At 9.30 a.m., Mbombo held a press conference in which she announced the police's firm intention that "today we are ending this matter", telling eNCA that "The plan is that we intend to ensure that today we end this strike. If they resist, like I said, today is a day that we intend to end the violence." Similarly, SAPS spokesman Dennis Adriao told a journalist, "Today is unfortunately D-day. It is an illegal gathering. We've tried to negotiate and we'll try again, but if that fails, we'll obviously have to go to a tactical phase." To other journalists he said:

We have tried over a number of days to negotiate with the leaders and with the gathering here at the mine, our objective is to get the people to surrender their weapons and to disperse peacefully. Today is D-day in terms of if they don't comply then we will have to act... we will have to take steps.

Proceeding with the plan to encircle the miners and offer them a chance to disperse, SAPS assembled around the koppie, with the difference from previous days consisting primarily in the fact that their armoured vehicles – several Nyalas pre-positioned around the koppie – pulled trailers full of barbed wire. The barbed wire was intended to be uncoiled discreetly at a later moment to prevent strikers from dispersing into police lines and attacking them, but the wire was immediately visible from the koppie and provoked a hostile response from the strikers. Other preparations included an order of 4,000 additional rounds of R5 ammunition (which was delivered to Marikana in the afternoon but sent back as unneeded) and a request to station four mortuary vehicles, equipped to remove up to sixteen corpses, at Marikana (although only one hearse was available and it did not arrive until around 1 p.m.). In addition, the police forces stationed at Marikana now included several elite units: in addition to 176 public-order policing officers, there were 337 officers from specialised units including the Tactical Reaction Unit, Special Task Force, National Intervention Unit and the K-9.

When my husband was going to work, leaving me, he told me that they are going to a meeting, where they are going to be addressed by the union. He hoped to hear from the union whether they had managed to come to an agreement with Lonmin, whether they were going back to work tomorrow, and how much they would get paid.

— Makopane Thelejane, whose husband Thabiso died at the second scene

The atmosphere at the scene was later described as highly hostile. In response to the evident hardening of the police's attitude, at least two strikers made inflammatory speeches to the other strikers, in which they implied an intention to resist any police intervention, including possibly through violent means. There were also reports that some strikers had been anointed with muti, which SAPS later said had made them believe they were "invincible"; other observers suggested that even if this were not the case, the reports might have encouraged the perception by police officers that the strikers were irrational or otherwise threatening.

At around 1 p.m., Johannes Seoka, the Anglican Bishop of Pretoria and the chairman of the South African Council of Churches, arrived at the koppie and spoke to the strikers' leaders, who asked him to have Lonmin management address the crowd at the koppie. At around the same time, beginning at 1.30 p.m., the SAPS operational command held another meeting. According to minutes of the meeting, the operational command decided that SAPS would again ask the strikers to lay down their weapons and leave the koppie and would thereafter search any stragglers who remained on the koppie; but the meeting also reaffirmed the tactical option as a last resort if the strikers refused to comply. They also discussed how the tactical option would be implemented on the ground. Subsequent investigation concluded that SAPS probably understood at this point that the strikers would not comply and that the tactical option would be necessary. When Bishop Seoka met with Lonmin managers, they told him that the strikers should be told again that management would negotiate only if they disarmed and left the koppie; however, before Seoka could transmit this message to the koppie, somebody pulled him aside and advised him that the koppie had become off limits as a "security risk zone".

The operational command had agreed to launch the operation at 3.30 p.m., but it was delayed by a final visit to the koppie by AMCU's president Mathunjwa. At a press briefing the following day, Mathunjwa cried as he recounted his attempt to persuade the occupying miners to disperse: "I pleaded with them: 'The writing is on the wall, they are going to kill you'". Video footage was later made public in which he could be seen on his knees pleading with the strikers. Mathunjwa later said that the strikers had dug into their protest because Lonmin had reneged on its commitment that "once you're there peacefully at work, management will address your grievances through union structures". Specifically, he claimed that Lonmin management had promised on 15 August that it would negotiate with the strikers if they returned to work, but that this promise was retracted on the morning of 16 August. Mathunjwa left the koppie just before 3.40 p.m., when the operation began. Subsequent events took place in two main locations: so-called scene one, at the koppie which the strikers had occupied throughout the week, and scene two, at a smaller koppie nearby. According to official figures, 34 people were killed and 78 injured in total across both scenes.

=== Scene one ===
During the first fifteen minutes of the operation, police officers unrolled the barbed wire and one Nyala was repositioned, cutting off some strikers who had been leaving the koppie with their weapons. SAPS alleged that during this time there were several minor confrontations as groups of strikers attempted to enter the neutral zone between the police lines and the crowd of strikers, and that some strikers fired bullets at an Nyala. Subsequent evidence contradicted this but did indicate that at least one Nyala was attacked with spears and other rudimentary weapons. The commanding officer said that he was in another Nyala and could hear that it was also under attack but could not tell whether it was being hit by stones or by bullets. Believing that the public-order policing forces were under attack by the strikers, the commanding officer authorised the use of non-lethal force and then instructed the Nyalas to drive among the strikers in an attempt to disperse them and prevent them from storming the police lines. Overall, police accounts of the events emphasised the officers' perception that they were under attack by the strikers.

Apparently contributing to the police's perception of a threat was that, by 3.53 p.m., a group of over 100 mineworkers was approaching a passage of land between a police line and a kraal at the base of the koppie; some of them still carried sharp weapons. Shortly thereafter, the public-order policing unit initiated the use of non-lethal force, firing three stun grenades, eight teargas canisters, and two water cannons. This fragmented the group of advancing mineworkers, changing the course of most of them, but a group of 11 or 12 mineworkers continued to advance around the kraal and in doing so came within 20 metres of a line of Tactical Response Team members. SAPS contended that this group intended to attack the police and drive them away from the koppie. Representatives of the strikers pointed out that the group was proceeding along a path which led to the neighbouring Nkaneng informal settlement and contended that they intended only to leave the koppie for Nkaneng. At about 3.54 p.m., a mineworker in this group fired at least one pistol shot as the group advanced, as shown in video footage and witnessed by a Reuters photographer. Within ten seconds, 47 Tactical Response Team members opened fire with their R5 assault rifles, as did one public-order policing officer. Legal representatives for the strikers argued that the officers had opened fire as a result of an order, seconds earlier, by the operational commander to "engage, engage, engage", but officers involved said that the order was clearly directed at public-order policing officers, not the Tactical Response Team members, and that the Tactical Response Team members in any case believed that they were under threat of imminent attack by the strikers. The police later said that the use of live ammunition had become necessary when the use of non-lethal force failed to halt the advance of what it called a "militant group [which] stormed toward the police firing shots and wielding dangerous weapons".

Most people then called for us to get off the mountain, and as we were coming down, the shooting began. Most people who were shot near the kraal were trying to get into the settlement; the blood we saw is theirs. We ran in the other direction, as it was impossible now to make it through the bullets... We ran until we got to the meeting spot and watched the incidents at the koppie. Two helicopters landed; soldiers and police surrounded the area. We never saw anyone coming out of the koppie.

— An unnamed striker

The volley of gunfire lasted eight or 12 seconds and involved 328 rounds of live ammunition. During the first four seconds, several warning shots were fired into the ground in front of the strikers, raising a dust cloud which obscured the officers' view of the strikers but into which many of them continued to fire. After about nine seconds, a Tactical Response Team commander raised his fist and shouted "cease fire", but some officers continued firing. Several officers admitted that their rifles had been set to automatic fire. 17 strikers were killed, and those injured at scene one did not receive medical attention until about an hour later.

=== Scene two ===
The shootings at scene two, on the smaller koppie less than 500 metres away from scene one, began about 15 minutes after the first shooting. Senior police officers present at Marikana, including the overall operational commander, said that they had not known that the shooting at scene one had occurred and therefore did not halt the intervention but instead gathered nearby to regroup. Subsequent investigation cast doubt on their claim to ignorance of the earlier shooting. In any event, three separate police units – the National Intervention Unit, the Tactical Response Team, and a mixed unit including the K9 – ultimately converged on the small koppie from separate directions, apparently intending to disarm and arrest strikers who had fled towards the small koppie during and after the shooting at scene one.

Over the course of 11 minutes, various members of each of the three units fired at strikers on the small koppie, discharging 295 bullets in total. Fourteen mineworkers died on the scene and three later died in hospital. Ten were killed in a crevice in a rocky area on the koppie, where they appeared to have attempted to hide. A police report submitted in the early hours of 17 August to the President and the Minister of International Relations and Cooperation provided the following account of the events at scene two:

The dispersion action had commenced at this time and the protesters were driven from their stronghold to a high bushy ground in the close vicinity. The Police members encircled the area and attempted to force the protesters out by means of water cannons, rubber bullets and stun grenades. The Police advance to arrest the armed protesters resulting sic in Police officers having to again employ force to defend themselves at close quarters. This resulted in 13 more protester deaths with 15 more wounded at the second incident.

Police officers testified that they had repeatedly told the mineworkers to lay down their weapons and come out in the open but that some had refused or even had fired at the police. Several officers also said that they had been told, or had inferred from the sound of gunfire, that they were under attack by the mineworkers; subsequent investigation suggested that they might have mistakenly believed that SAPS gunfire was coming from strikers. In addition, analyst David Bruce of the Institute for Security Studies argued that the shootings at scene two probably involved "a strong element of vindictive hostility towards the strikers", pointing in particular to the various witness statements that claimed that some of the victims had been shot while surrendering. Based on a preliminary examination of the crime scene, Greg Marinovich of the Daily Maverick concluded that "heavily armed police hunted down and killed the miners in cold blood" at scene two.

The events at scene two were especially difficult to reconstruct because no crime scene photographs were taken and the crime scene was not adequately preserved. In particular, one warrant officer testified to having removed weapons from the persons and vicinity of injured and dead mineworkers, on his own initiative and without recording where he had found them. He then replaced the weapons but admitted he was not certain he had returned them to their original positions. It was estimated that, as a result, weapons were in effect planted on the bodies of at least six dead mineworkers. In addition, SAPS did not immediately provide a clear account of the events at scene two, but rather suggested in its initial media statements that the shootings had proceeded in a single continuous stage at a single location around the main koppie.

== Immediate government response: 16–19 August ==
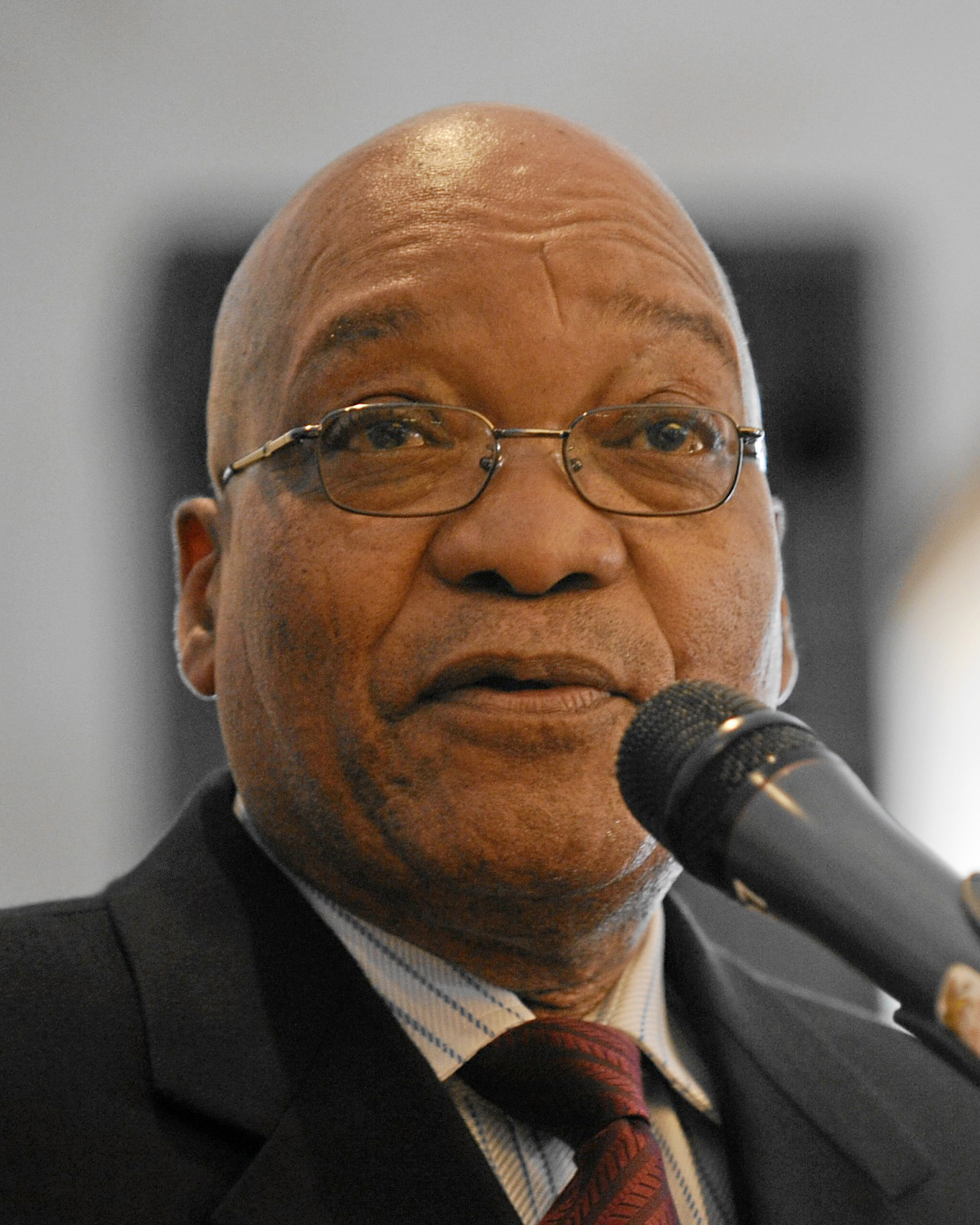
President Jacob Zuma said he was "shocked and dismayed" by the shooting.

On 16 August, as the media began to report that the police had opened fire on strikers, the Ministry of Police acknowledged that there had been deaths but defended the police's actions, writing, "To protest is a legal and constitutional right of any citizen. However, these rights do not imply that people should be barbaric, intimidating and hold illegal gatherings. We had a situation where people who were armed to the teeth attacked and killed other." President Jacob Zuma – who at the time was in Maputo, Mozambique, attending a summit of the Southern African Development Community – condemned the killings but made no reference to the actions of the police, saying in a statement:

We are shocked and dismayed at this senseless violence. We believe there is enough space in our democratic order for any dispute to be resolved through dialogue without any breaches of the law or violence. We call upon the labour movement and business to work with government to arrest the situation before it deteriorates any further. I have instructed law enforcement agencies to do everything possible to bring the situation under control and to bring the perpetrators of violence to book... We extend our deepest condolences to the families of all who have lost their lives since the beginning of this violent action.

The following day, Zuma returned early from Mozambique to visit the site of the shootings in Rustenberg, and announced that he would establish a commission of inquiry to discover "the real cause" of the tragedy. The same day, National Police Commissioner Riah Phiyega told the media, "This is no time for blaming, this is no time for finger-pointing. It is a time for us to mourn". Phiyega said that the police had acted in self-defence, having been "forced to use maximum force to defend themselves". To support this argument she presented aerial photography of the events which she claimed demonstrated that the strikers had advanced towards the police force before the police had opened fire. However, the Independent Police Investigative Directorate (IPID) announced that an investigation would be conducted to determine whether the police response had been proportionate to the threat posed by the striking miners.

On 19 August, Zuma called for a national week of mourning, as an opportunity to "reflect on the sanctity of human life and the right to life". Meanwhile, the day after the shootings, a group of about 50 women in the Marikana community staged a protest, demanding that the police officers responsible for the shooting be fired. The families of the miners criticised the government's delay in producing a list of the dead, which left many uncertain whether missing members of their families were amongst those killed, wounded, or arrested on 16 August.

== Arrests and murder charges: August–September ==
On 16 August, SAPS had arrested 259 mineworkers in the vicinity of the massacre site, holding them in cells across various police stations in the North West and Gauteng province. Over the next fortnight, 11 more strikers were arrested in the settlements around Marikana, reportedly including some who were detained after being discharged from hospital. On 30 August, the National Prosecuting Authority (NPA) told the media that all 270 mineworkers would be charged in the Ga-Rankuwa Magistrate's Court, and, moreover, that each would be charged not only with public violence but also with the murder of their 34 colleagues who had been massacred on 16 August. This was the case even though some of those arrested had been unarmed or at the back of the crowd, and even though six of them remained hospitalised for injuries incurred during the massacre. The NPA did not dispute that it was SAPS officers who had shot the 34 victims, but argued that the murder charges were legally sound under South Africa's common purpose doctrine. The doctrine had attained public notoriety for its historical use by the apartheid government against anti-apartheid activists, but had been reaffirmed by courts in the post-apartheid era.

The news of the charges against the mineworkers caused public outcry, beginning with a demonstration of about 100 people who protested for the detainees' immediate release outside the courthouse on 30 August. ANC Treasurer-General Mathews Phosa called the NPA's decision "absurd", and Jeff Radebe, South Africa's Minister of Justice, acknowledged that the announcement had caused "shock, panic and confusion" among the public and promised to seek an explanation from the NPA. The head of the NPA, acting National Director of Public Prosecutions Nomgcobo Jiba, launched a review of the decision and announced on 2 September that it had been retracted. The 270 mineworkers would be released and the murder charges would be dropped provisionally, although the other provisional charges against them would remain in place. Jiba emphasised that the final decision on charges would be made only once all investigations had been completed.

The release of the detained mineworkers began the following day. They were released conditionally, on a warning, with their cases postponed pending the finalisation of investigations, including the finalisation of the commission of inquiry announced by Zuma. The NPA also pointed out that the decision as announced pertained only to the proposed murder charges under common purpose doctrine – a separate matter to the murder of the ten other people in the week before 16 August. Prosecutors said that seven suspects had been arrested in connection with the killing of the two SAPS officers on 13 August, and that one person had been charged with the murder of the two Lonmin security guards on 12 August.

Upon their release, several mineworkers told the media that they had been subject to police brutality while in detention. Indeed, 150 of them had filed complaints with IPID alleging that they had been assaulted by police in their cells.

== Continuation of strike: August–September ==
We are treating the developments around police operations this afternoon with the utmost seriousness. The South African Police Service (SAPS) have been in charge of public order and safety on the ground since the violence between competing labour factions erupted over the weekend, claiming the lives of eight of our employees and two police officers. It goes without saying that we deeply regret the further loss of life in what is clearly a public order rather than labour relations associated matter.

— Statement of Lonmin chairman Roger Phillimore, 16 August 2012

=== Ultimatums ignored: 20–24 August ===
In a statement, Lonmin expressed regret for the loss of life during the massacre, which it viewed as a "public order" matter rather than a "labour relations" matter. In the aftermath of the massacre, the company faced serious economic pressure, given already low platinum prices on the world market: its share value had declined by millions of dollars, and it soon announced that it would be unable to meet its annual production targets and might have to renegotiate its debt payments. Simon Scott, Lonmin's chief financial officer and acting chief executive, said that the company needed to "rebuild the Lonmin brand and rebuild the platinum brand".

On 19 August, Lonmin issued a "final ultimatum", ordering its employees to return to work the following day – a Monday – or face dismissal. Strikers told the press that, unless Lonmin met the demands of the strike, they would return not to work but to the koppie, viewing the ultimatum as an "insult" to those who had been killed, arrested, and hospitalised on 16 August. AMCU agreed that the ultimatum was "very unfair".

The next day, Lonmin said that only about 27 per cent of workers had arrived for their shifts and announced that it would issue a 24-hour extension on the deadline to return to work. Nonetheless, by Friday 24 August, only about 23 per cent of the workforce was present at the mine, far too few for production to resume. This decreased to 13 per cent on Monday 27 August, even though the week of national mourning had by then ended.

=== Negotiations: August–September ===
In a statement welcomed by Lonmin, the government announced on 24 August that the Department of Labour would assist Lonmin in negotiating with strikers to reach "a peace accord... which allows for a peaceful return to work". When negotiations began, they were mediated by Bishop Seoka of the South African Council of Churches. Patekile Holomisa, the leader of the Congress of Traditional Leaders, was also involved. Lonmin insisted that it would not negotiate wages until a peace agreement was signed, but the strikers continued to insist on their demand for a R12,500 monthly wage, although they reportedly disagreed even amongst themselves whether that figure included deductions. At one point in talks, the strikers' representatives agreed to lower their wage demand – by a single rand, to R12,499. On 5 September, as negotiations deadlocked and wildcat strikes spread to other mines across the country, over 1,000 mineworkers held a demonstration at the Marikana mine, reiterating their wage demands amid a heavy police presence. Late that night, the negotiators finalised a peace agreement, but – though it was signed by the Department of Labour, the NUM, and two smaller unions, Solidarity and UASA – it was not signed by AMCU or by the representative of Lonmin's non-unionised workers.

On 8 September, AMCU president Mathunjwa said of his union, "When the employer is prepared to make an offer on the table, we shall make ourselves available"; the same day, Lonmin reported that only two per cent of Marikana workers had arrived for their shifts. Lonmin said that the strikes were driven by about 3,000 rock drill operators, and that its other 26,000 employees were not participating but faced intimidation from the strikers and were therefore afraid to return to work. NUM's Baleni agreed that other mineworkers had not returned to work because they faced intimidation from the strikers: "The workers are still scared. There have been threats that those who have reported for duty would have their homes torched. Some of the workers also feel threatened by their managers. Peace has not really prevailed at this stage, which is the main reason why workers would stay away."

Negotiations on Lonmin wages began on Monday 10 September, with a Lonmin executive telling the press, "If workers don't come to work, we will still pursue the peace path. That is very, very necessary for us to achieve because this level of intimidation and people fearing for their lives obviously does not help anybody. For now it is a fragile process and we need to nurture it." The same day, strikers at Marikana stayed away from work and staged a demonstration, in defiance of the 6 September peace accord. The deadline for mineworkers to return to work was extended by another 24-hour period, but they did not return to work the following day either. The Commission for Conciliation, Mediation and Arbitration, a public body facilitating the negotiations, warned the striking mineworkers that it could not launch wage negotiations until they returned to work.

=== Security clampdown: 14–16 September ===
Tensions escalated that weekend, after, on Friday 14 September, the striking mineworkers gathered on the koppie and collectively rejected as inadequate Lonmin's proposed wage increase. The strike had by then spread to the nearby Rustenberg mines of platinum giant Anglo American Platinum (Amplats), and some labour activists in the area were proposing a general strike of mineworkers. That afternoon, the security cluster of ministers in President Zuma's cabinet announced a clampdown on illegal labour protests, with Justice Minister Radebe declaring, "Our government will not tolerate these acts any further", and warning that anybody participating in illegal gatherings would be "dealt with very swiftly, without any further delay". The military – a reported 1,000 soldiers – was deployed to the platinum belt to provide back-up for SAPS. Before dawn on 15 September, 500 SAPS officers, assisted by the army, raided mineworkers' hostels in Marikana, seizing weapons including metal rods, machetes, spears, and sticks. Six men were arrested during the raids for illegal possession of weapons and drugs, and another six were detained in protests in Marikana later in the day as SAPS used rubber bullets and tear gas to disperse a gathering of Lonmin strikers. Military and police helicopters and armoured police cars remained present around the Marikana mine for the rest of the weekend. On Sunday 16 September, in response to the previous day's violence, a crowd of hundreds of mineworkers from the Rustenberg area – reportedly dominated by workers at Amplats mines – marched towards the Rustenberg police station, protesting the violence against strikers. They were persuaded by SAPS to disperse because they lacked a permit for the demonstration and therefore were gathering illegally, but Al Jazeera reported that the presence of police helicopters was viewed as intimidation calculated to compel them to disperse.

=== Resolution: 18–20 September ===
On 18 September, Bishop Seoka announced that the strikers had agreed to moderate their wage demands and then that a resolution had been reached. Late that night, the parties signed a new wage agreement which secured the strikers' return to work. It entailed wage increases of varying magnitudes for different categories of work, with an average rise of between 11 and 22 per cent, effective from 1 October. Rock drill operators, for example, would receive an increase to R11,078 monthly. All workers would also receive a once-off bonus of R2,000 to compensate them for the wages they had foregone during the strike. The strikers had apparently been informed of the offer on the afternoon of 18 September, and, the following day, they gathered at Wonderkop stadium – where rockdrillers had initially agreed to strike on 9 August – to celebrate the agreement, singing the national anthem. According to the Mail & Guardian, the strikers were partly convinced to accept the agreement because of "a tacit agreement between all involved to allow the workers to believe that a minimum gross entry wage of R12,500 would be implemented within two years". The mineworker who had represented non-unionised strikers during the talks said that Lonmin management had been asked to promise to work towards this.

Lonmin expressed satisfaction with the agreement as the conclusion of a difficult process, while acknowledging that it was "only one step in a long and difficult process which lies ahead for everyone who has been affected by the events at Marikana". AMCU's Mathunjwa said in a statement, "This could have been done without losing lives". The Commission for Conciliation, Mediation and Arbitration congratulated the parties on their efforts, and, after the agreement was announced, the spot platinum price fell by two per cent and the exchange rate strengthened. However, although Lonmin said that it viewed the situation at Marikana as "extraordinary", some observers worried that Lonmin's concessions to the strikers would create moral hazard and inspire copycat wildcat strikes, with similarly ambitious wage demands, at other mines. Zwelinzima Vavi, the general secretary of Cosatu, echoed this concern; as did Baleni of the NUM: "The normal bargaining processes have been compromised. It does suggest that unprotected action, an element of anarchy, can be easily rewarded, people can do certain wrong things with impunity and that means that it can roll over to other operations." Noting the limitations of the agreement from another perspective, a member of the Marikana Solidarity Campaign pointed out that there was much more work still to be done, including in supporting the families of the victims of the massacre, offering counselling for post-traumatic stress, and overseeing the official government inquiry:

The campaign will go on. This campaign is aimed at helping workers. People died here at Marikana. Something needs to be done. This is a campaign to ensure justice for the people of Marikana. We want the culprits to be brought to book, and it is crucial that justice is seen to be done here. It is our duty and the duty of this country to ensure justice is served, so that we can make sure this country is a democracy and to stop South Africa from going down the drain... During the past week people were taken from their homes and arrested by police, and people have been shot at. We need to ensure the safety of these people, and need to help stop police action against the people of Marikana. The work is enormous. Some people still need medical attention, and we also need to look at the living conditions of workers and the community at large. Then there is the problem of the unemployment of women and the high rate of illiteracy here. We need to help realise programmes to ensure people can get an income, that they can enjoy a reasonable standard of living.

As agreed, the Lonmin mineworkers returned to work on 20 September, though operations at the Marikana mine were temporarily disrupted once again a month later – on 18 October – when thousands of Lonmin employees staged a one-day walkout to protest the arrests of other mineworkers in other mining strikes elsewhere in the country.

== Public and political reaction ==
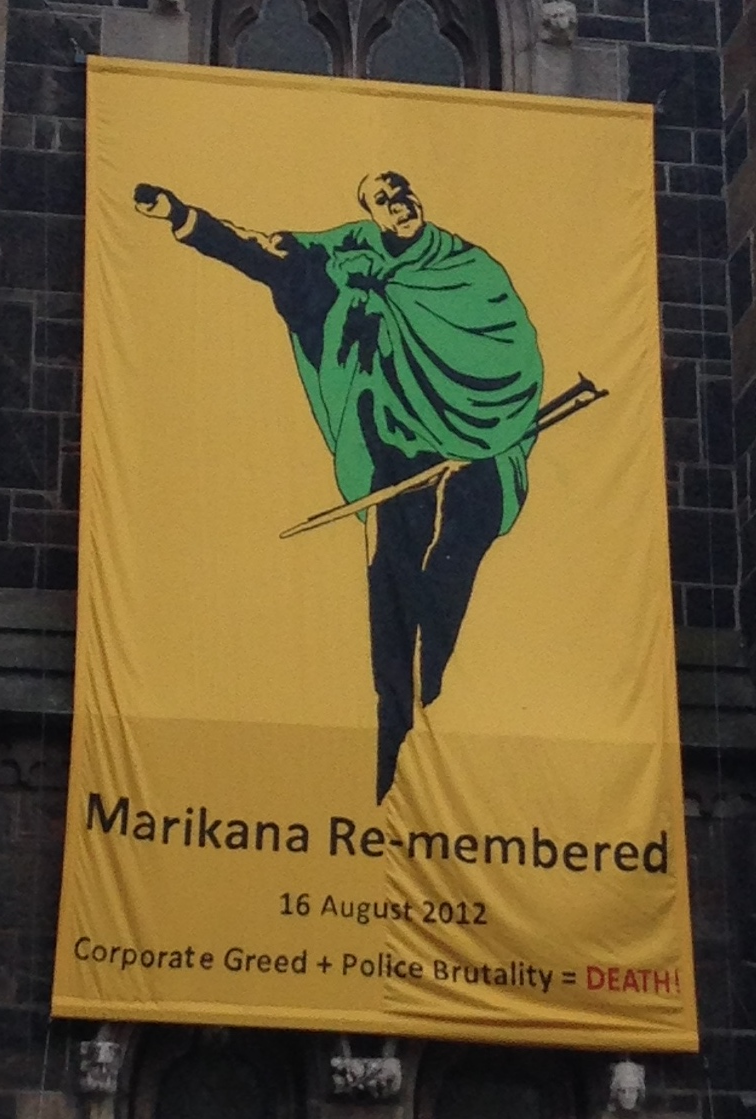
A commemorative banner outside the Central Methodist Mission in Cape Town.

=== Political response ===
Jonny Steinberg – a South African-born academic at Oxford University – suggested that the repressive police response at Marikana might have reflected an attempt by President Zuma to project authority over an increasingly fractured country and government ahead of the ANC's 53rd National Conference in December 2012. Ironically, however, observers expected that the events at Marikana would heighten the political pressure on Zuma ahead of the conference. Julius Malema, the former leader of the ANC Youth League, visited the scene of the shootings and called for Zuma to resign, saying, "How can he call on people to mourn those he has killed? He must step down." He also said:

A responsible president says to the police you must keep order, but please act with restraint. He says to them use maximum force. He has presided over the killing of our people, and therefore he must step down. Not even [the] apartheid government killed so many people. [The government] had no right to shoot. We have to uncover the truth about what happened here. In this regard, I've decided to institute a commission of inquiry. The inquiry will enable us to get to the real cause of the incident and to derive the necessary lessons, too. It is clear there is something serious behind these happenings and that's why I have taken a decision to establish the commission because we must get to the truth. This is a shocking thing. We do not know where it comes from and we have to address it.

Indeed, Al Jazeera wondered whether the controversy over Marikana would resurrect Malema's political career, after his suspension from the ANC several months earlier. Ramaphosa said that it was "very unfortunate that [Malema] took up a platform like this one where there is sadness and anger, to inflame the situation once again". The opposition Democratic Alliance joined Malema in criticising the police response to the strike. The Pan Africanist Youth Congress of Azania called for Zuma to fire Phiyega and Police Minister Nathi Mthethwa, and "strongly condemn[ed] the barbaric conduct of the police and the government's indifference in resolving the dispute".

The massacre attracted a political response abroad: in Auckland, protesters attacked the South African High Commission with paint bombs; and the White House's Deputy Press Secretary, Josh Earnest, told reporters that, "The American people are saddened at the tragic loss of life [at the Lonmin mines] and express our condolences to the families of those who have lost loved ones in this incident." In the weeks after the massacre, Zuma sought to reassure international investors: while visiting the European Union (EU) headquarters in Brussels, Belgium, he acknowledged the tragedy – saying, "Certainly we regarded the incident of Marikana as an unfortunate one. Nobody expected such an event" – but emphasised that it could have happened in "any country", that it "happened in the background of very stable democracy and very stable rule of law", and that he was in "full control" of the government response. Nonetheless, Karel de Gucht, the EU Trade Commissioner, said, "I realise that this is a social conflict, this is completely within the remit of the South African legislation and the South African political system. But we are... deeply troubled by the fact of all these dead victims."

On 21 August, Defence Minister Nosiviwe Mapisa-Nqakula became the first South African government official to apologise for the shooting when, during a visit to the Marikana koppie, she asked for forgiveness from angry miners who held up plastic packets of bullet casings to her. She said, "We agree, as you see us standing in front of you here, that blood was shed at this place. We agree that it was not something to our liking and, as a representative of the government, I apologise... I am begging, I beg and I apologise, may you find forgiveness in your hearts."

=== Union recriminations ===
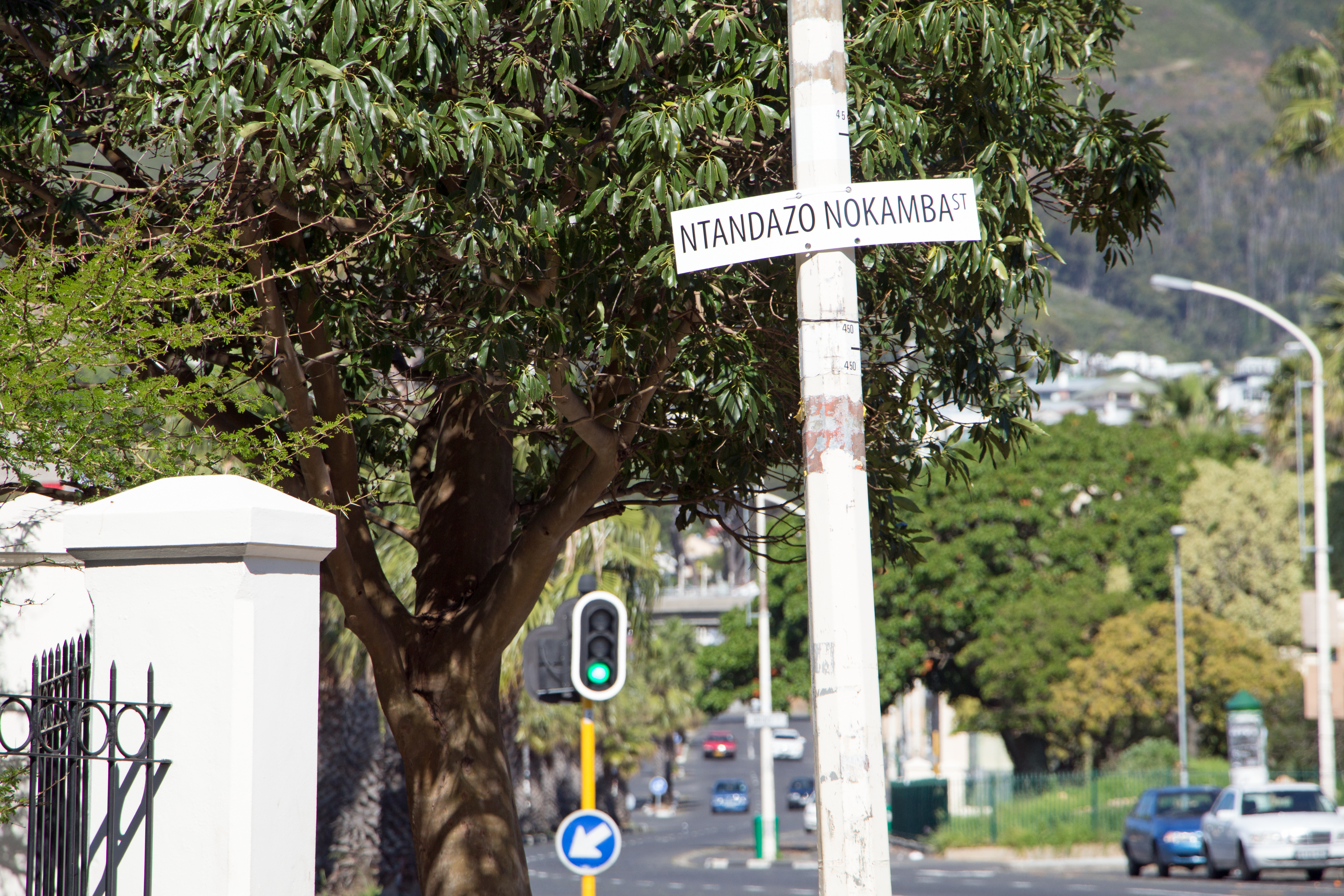
A work of protest art in Cape Town remembers one of the casualties.

The ANC's political partners in the Tripartite Alliance tended to suggest that AMCU was responsible for the tragedy. The South African Communist Party called for AMCU's leaders to be arrested for their role in the strike. Cosatu supported the police account of events, saying that the police had first used tear gas and water cannons on the miners, who "retaliated" with live ammunition. Baleni, NUM's general secretary, likewise defended the police, telling Kaya FM that, "The police were patient, but these people were extremely armed with dangerous weapons". Arguing that AMCU had instigated the bloodshed, NUM spokesman Lesiba Seshoka said, "These people said today they want to die on the hilltop. They said they will bring their children to die there. That is why we say the ringleaders must be arrested."

AMCU, by contrast, blamed Lonmin, the police, and the NUM for the tragedy. According to AMCU president Mathunjwa, the conflict at Lonmin had "nothing to do with AMCU" but rather was "an in-fight [sic] of the members of NUM with their offices", with NUM members occupying the koppie because they had lost faith in NUM representatives' ability to negotiate a fair settlement. He accused the NUM of colluding with Lonmin management to orchestrate the massacre – an accusation strongly denied by the NUM – and said, "We have to send condolences to those families whose members were brutally murdered by a lack of co-operation from management. We have done our bit. If the management had changed their commitment, surely lives could have been saved." On the police response, AMCU general secretary Jeffrey Mphahlele said, "There was no need whatsoever for these people to be killed like that". Some of the striking miners and their family members also blamed NUM for starting the violence on 11 August when NUM representatives shot at strikers.

Straying slightly from the Cosatu line, the spokesman of the National Education, Health, and Allied Workers Union – another large Cosatu affiliate – said:

This atrocious and senseless killing of workers is deplorable and unnecessary. Our union feels Lonmin should be made to account for this tragedy. We also demand an investigation on the role of labor brokers in this whole [incident]. The remuneration and working conditions of miners also needed to be addressed, as these mining companies have been allowed to get away with murder for far too long. Our police service has adopted and perfected the apartheid tactics and the militarisation of the service, and encouraged the use of force to resolve disputes and conflicts. Police tactics and training needed to be reviewed in light of Thursday's shooting. The union demands that all police officers who deal with protests be taught disciplined ways of controlling protesters. We cannot afford to have a police force that is slaughtering protesters in the new dispensation.

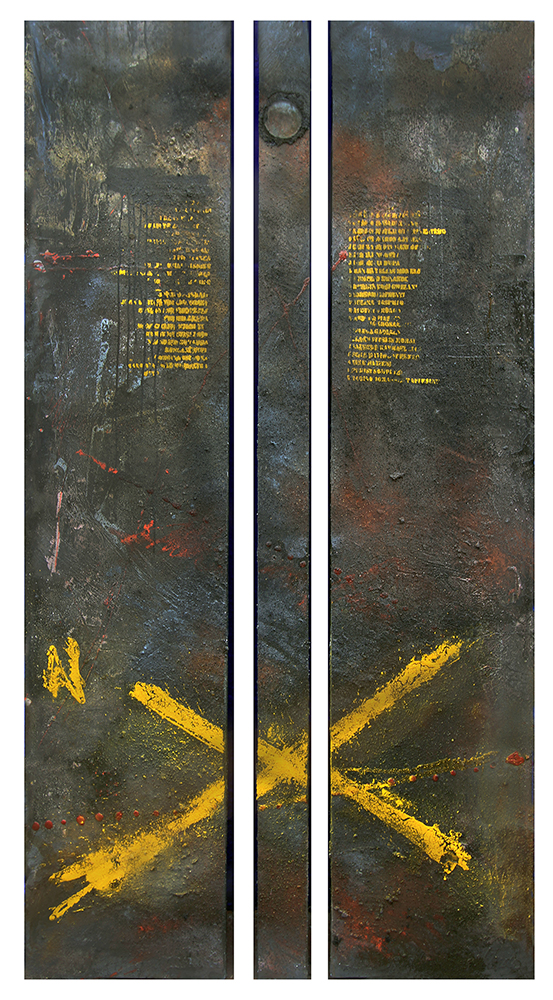
A commemorative artwork by artist Jeannette Unite

=== Civil society ===
The day after the massacre, a small public protest against the killings was held outside Parliament in Cape Town. On 21 August, a delegation from the National Interfaith Council of South Africa visited Marikana to offer condolences and support to the community. The delegation included Pastor Ray McCauley; Archbishop Buti Tlhagale; and Chief Rabbi Warren Goldstein. The director of the Institute for Democracy in Africa, Paul Graham, asked, "Why did South African policemen use live ammunition and interfere with a crime scene?" He also criticised the proposed commission of inquiry, describing it as "very disappointing that those appointed to the commission of inquiry include cabinet ministers. They cannot be independent and will not be trusted." The local Marikana Solidarity Campaign subsequently received support from a civic delegation – including the Socio-Economic Rights Institute, Sonke Gender Justice, Studies in Poverty and Inequality, Students for Law and Social Justice, the Treatment Action Campaign, and Section 27 – which travelled to Marikana to meet with workers and women.

On the first anniversary of the massacre, the magazine Amandla! reflected that:

Perhaps the most important lesson of Marikana is that the state can gun down dozens of black workers with little or no backlash from "civil society", the judicial system or from within the institutions that supposedly form the bedrock of democracy... In other words, the state can get away with mass murder, with apparent impunity in terms of institutional conceptions of justice and political accountability... The nuanced and rigorous public debate and critical reflection that should have happened after Marikana has not happened. Instead, the country has spent the last year attempting to ignore or forget the massacre or belittle it by terming it a mere "tragedy", as if it were an act of nature or "a failure of intelligence".

=== Media ===
South African news media showed graphic footage and photos of the shootings, under headlines including "Killing Field", "Mine Slaughter", and "Bloodbath". The Sowetan issued a front-page editorial which argued that Marikana reflected that apartheid brutalities against black workers were "continuing in a different guise now". Reuters described the incident as having led South Africa to question "its post-apartheid soul". Al Jazeera tentatively suggested that Lonmin's links to the ruling ANC reflected an "economic apartheid", while Bloomberg linked the clashes to a growing wealth gap. Mining Weekly said that the massacre would hurt South Africa as a destination for investment.

In a controversial series of stand-up comedy shows, South African comedian Trevor Noah made light of the events, appearing to side with the police by arguing that they had "used teargas all week" but "couldn't control people" and "had to use ammunition because the strikers had weapons". He also joked that "teargas is a waste of time" and ineffective against protesters, asking "Which strike has ever ended because of teargas?" Comparing this response with Noah's biting critique of the American police response to the George Floyd protests, one commentator described Noah's remarks about Marikana as "the best example of [a certain] South African middle class hypocrisy".

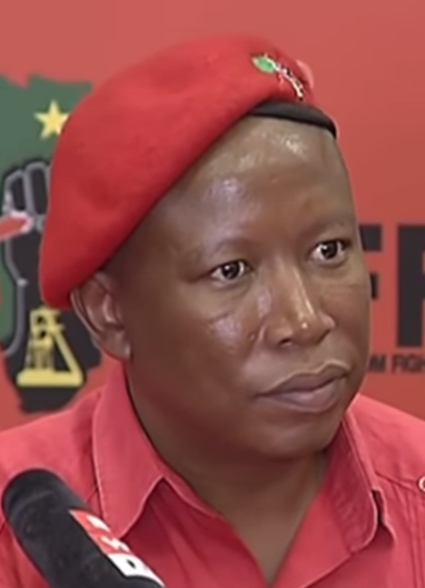
Firebrand politician Julius Malema called for a national mining strike sharing the Lonmin workers' demand for a blanket wage of R12,500.

=== Strikes elsewhere ===
As the Lonmin strike continued, Thandi Modise, the Premier of the North West, correctly predicted that the strikes would spread if the government did not adequately address inequality in South Africa. Indeed, some politicians – notably Julius Malema – argued that other mineworkers should take up the Lonmin workers' demand for a R12,5000 wage and called for a nationwide strike in South Africa's mining sector, including with the objective of removing the incumbent NUM leadership. In early September, in the West Rand, South Africa's gold mining hub, Malema told a crowd of mineworkers:

You must render the mines ungovernable... There must be a national strike. They have been stealing this gold from you. Now it is your turn. You want your piece of gold. These people are making billions from these mines.

==== Platinum mining ====
The first wave of copycat strikes broke out at other mines in Rustenberg's platinum belt (centred on the Bushveld complex), which together account for some three-quarters of the world's platinum reserves. The first mine to be affected was another NUM-majority platinum mine in Rustenberg, the Bafokeng Rasimone Platinum Joint-Venture, which was operated by Royal Bafokeng Platinum and located about 30 kilometres northwest of Marikana. The Bafokeng wildcat strike was also initiated by rock drill operators, at the mine's north shaft, and repeated the demand at Marikana for a wage of R12,500. Initiated on 22 August, the strike involved around 500 workers but remained largely peaceful and ended on 24 August in a deal between workers and mine management. Later, operations were suspended at Atlatsa Resources's Bokoni platinum mine in Limpopo province, where workers launched a wildcat strike on 1 October, ultimately leading to the dismissal of 2,161 miners and not fully resolved until December. Impala, which had hosted a wildcat strike earlier in 2012, was largely unaffected, but issued a pre-emptive 4.8 per cent pay rise in September to avert the risk of further industrial action.

Especially hard hit, however, was the world's top platinum producer, Amplats, where workers launched an unprotected strike on September 12 to demand a baseline salary of R16,000 per month. The strike reportedly began with about 1,000 workers at the Siphumelele mine and quickly spread to other Amplats operations, forcing the company to suspend operations at least five of the company's mines. On 19 September, the day after an agreement was reached at Marikana, police used rubber bullets, tear gas, and stun grenades to disperse a gathering at a squatter camp neighbouring an Amplats mine; according to an unconfirmed report from Central Methodist Church Bishop Paul Verryn, one woman died after being struck by a rubber bullet. The Amplats strike was frequently violent, with protests centred on the Nkaneng informal settlement. On 4 October, one 48-year-old striker died after police opened fire with rubber bullets on a gathering of strikers on a hill adjacent to Amplats's Merensky reef. Police also used tear gas, stun grenades, and water cannons to disperse strikers. On 5 October, Amplat fired 12,000 strikers, citing their failure to comply with company ultimatums to return to work and then to attend disciplinary hearings. The following week, early on the morning of 11 October, two men died in Nkaneng, where striking mineworkers were demonstrating – one of the victims had been shot twice and died in hospital, while the other had been torched. Amplats said that one of the men was a mine employee on his way to work. Minibus taxis, used by workers to get to work, were also torched. Later on 11 October, a group of strikers went to Bathopele mine to attempt to suspend operations there; they were dispersed by police rubber bullets, and there were 14 arrests. The strike de-escalated in late October when Amplats agreed to reinstate the dismissed miners and pay them a hardship bonus if they returned to work.

==== Gold mining ====
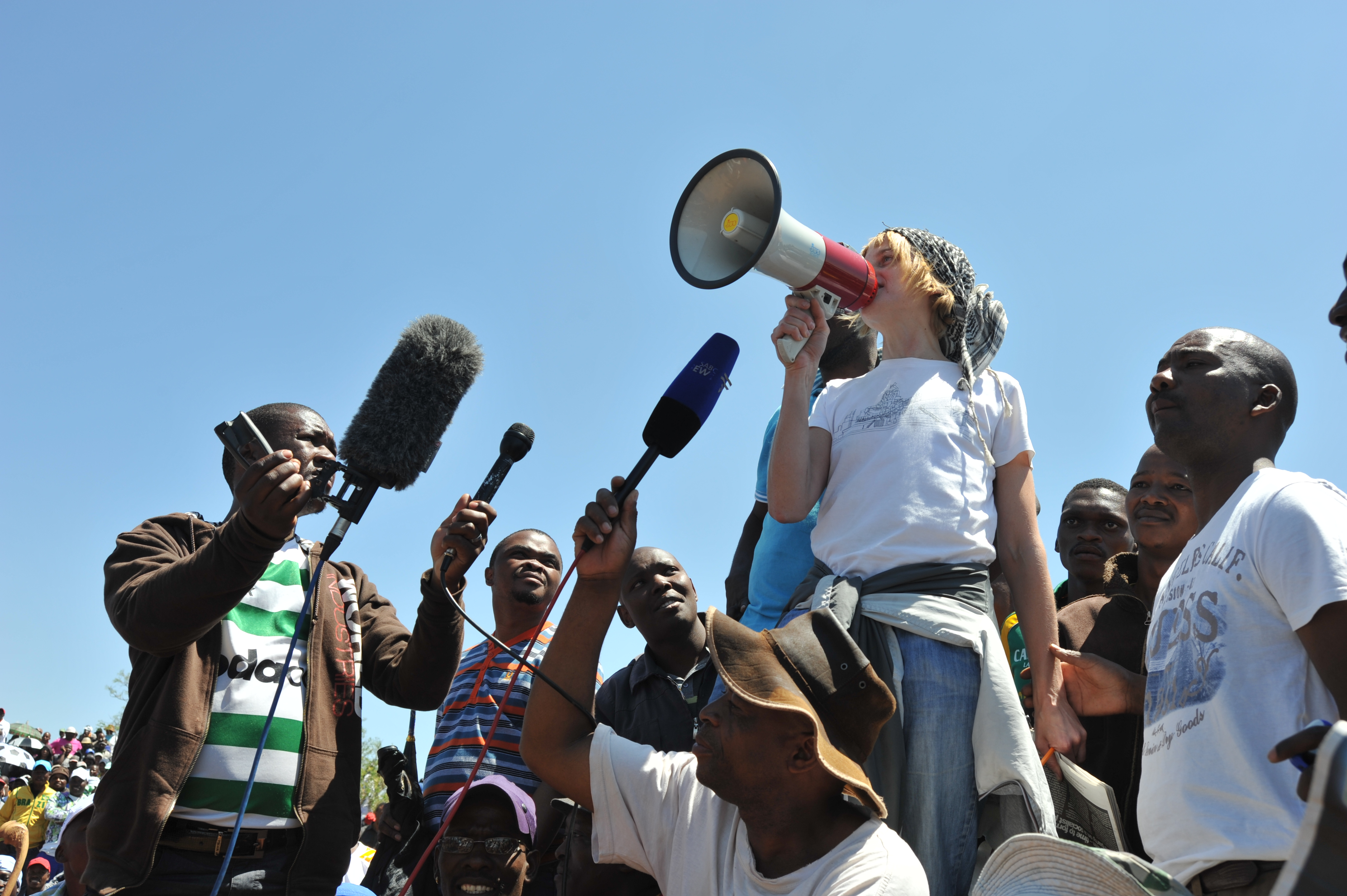
An activist addresses striking Gold Fields mineworkers in Carletonville, Gauteng, October 2012.

Yet, long before the Amplats strike was resolved, the platinum strikes had spilled over into the gold mining sector (which accounted for about one-third of global gold production) and into South Africa's Gauteng province, ultimately necessitating a multi-mine collective bargaining process in the Chamber of Mines. Gold Fields, the world's fourth-largest gold bullion producer, was affected by unprotected industrial action at least two of its South African mines between late August and early November, at its peak involving 23,540 of Gold Fields's 35,700 employees and costing the company more than R1.2 billion in revenue. First, KDC East – the eastern section of the KDC mine on the West Rand near Carletonville, Gauteng – was affected by a week-long unprotected strike, primarily concerning the demand of NUM-affiliated miners that their NUM representatives resign. Though that strike ended on 5 September, a larger unprotected strike began days later, on 9 September, among the 15,000 employees of KDC West. On 21 September, the strike spread to the west section of Gold Fields's Beatrix mine in the Free State (employing 9,000 people); by 24 September, the entirety of the Beatrix mine had been affected, and production was suspended at both KDC West and Beatrix. In mid-October, after over 70 Gold Fields miners were arrested for public violence in connection with the strike, the strike was re-joined by approximately 8,500 of the 12,400 employees employed at KDC East, necessitating the suspension of production across the entire KDC operation. Most workers at Beatrix and KDC West returned to work between 16 October and 18 October, having been threatened with dismissal; however, Gold Fields had to follow through on its ultimatum by firing several thousand workers who had not complied with the deadline: 1,500 KDC West employees, and 8,100 KDC East employees. Given the failure of the ultimatum to secure a return to work at KDC East, the strike there did not end until early November, when most of those fired were reinstated.

A similar sequence of events unfolded at Harmony Gold's Kusasalethu gold mine near Carletonville. There, the majority of the workforce (comprising 5,400 persons) was on unprotected strike between 3 October and 25 October, when most workers complied with an ultimatum from Harmony Gold to return to work under threat of dismissal. Gold One mines were also affected, though more intermittently. On 4 September, a wildcat strike immediately turned violent when about 60 striking miners at Gold One's Modder East mine, near Springs, Gauteng, attempted to block other employees from reporting to work; the mine's private security and SAPS forcibly dispersed them using tear gas and rubber bullets, and four miners were hospitalised. The strikers were fired and 13 were arrested on charges of public violence. The following month, on 1 October, another wildcat strike broke out at Cooke 4 shaft in Gold One's newest acquisition, the Ezulwini gold and uranium mine. Ezulwini employed only 1,900 employees, but, the following week, Gold One dismissed 1,435 of them; it then suspended operations at the mine for a full month in order to ensure the safety of its workers and assets.

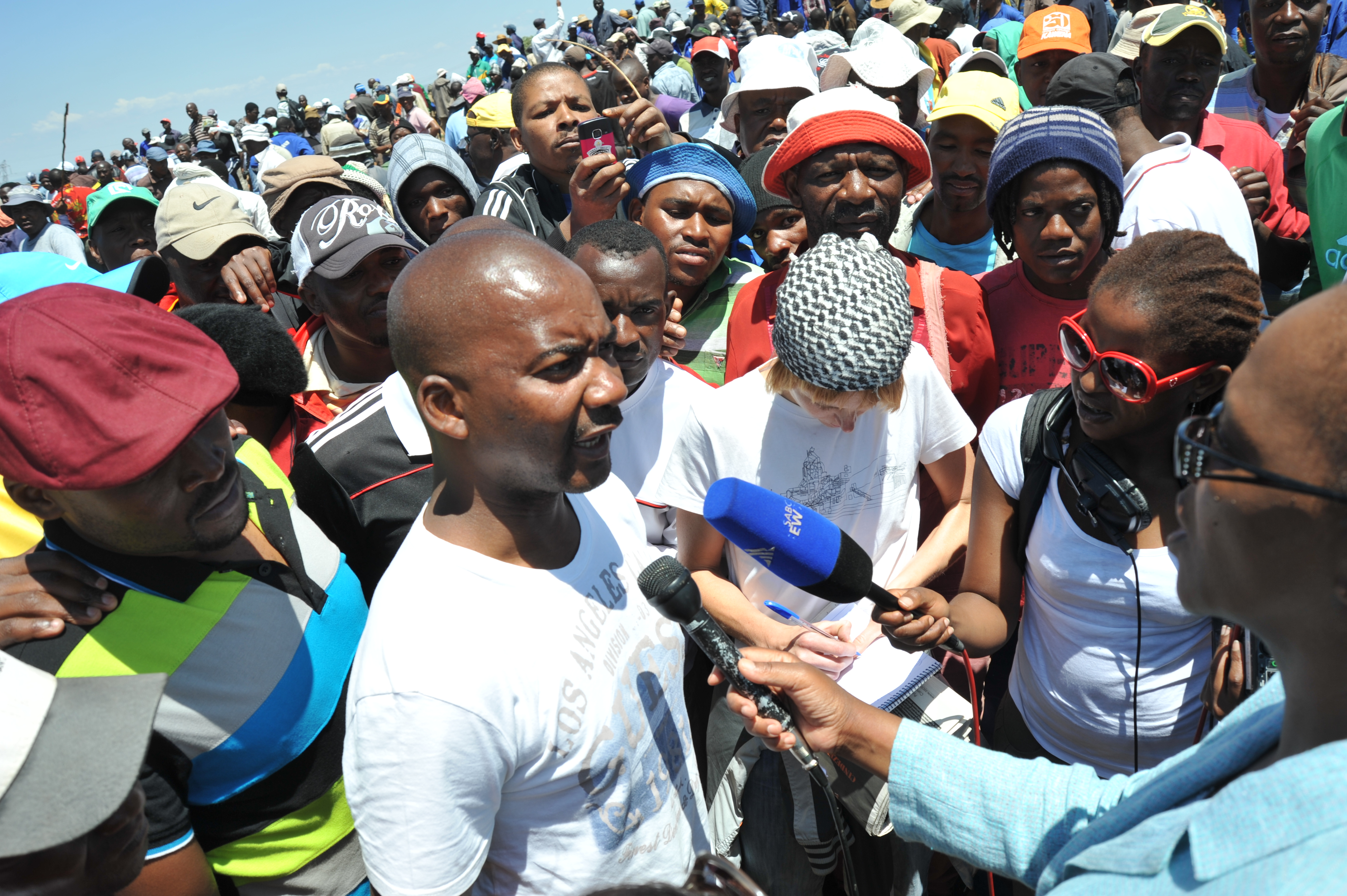
An activist talks to the media during a gathering of strikers, October 2012.

Finally, a nationwide wildcat strike affected the operations of AngloGold Ashanti, the world's third-largest gold bullion producer. The strike began on 20 September among the 5,000 employees of AngloGold's Kopanang mine, with workers apparently demanding a wage increase to R12,500. On 26 September, AngloGold suspended its operations across the country, saying that the strike had spread to its other mines to affect most of its 35,000-strong workforce. By mid-October, all six of AngloGold's South African mines were still closed, with about 24,000 workers on strike. Most AngloGold workers returned to work by the end of October, but the strike continued in AngloGold's West Witswatersrand region, comprising the Mponeng, TauTona, and Savuka mines. Despite an ultimatum issued by AngloGold, sit-ins and work disruptions continued at Mponeng into November.

==== Other sectors ====
Nor were platinum and gold the only sectors affected. There were also wildcat strikes at Kumba Iron Ore's Sishen mine in the Northern Cape; Petra Diamonds' Cullinan mine in the Northern Cape; Samancor's Western chrome mine in the North West; an Xstrata mine in Brits in the North West; and Coal of Africa's Mooiplaats colliery in Mpumalanga. In mid-October, it was estimated that 80,000 to 100,000 South African miners had joined strikes – mostly unprotected – since August. As the Guardian noted, 75,000 miners equated to 15% of the sector's workforce. In addition, the post-Marikana wave of mining strikes was linked to a major trucking strike in September to October 2012.

== Official commission of inquiry ==
Marikana Commission of Inquiry
- Date: 1 October 2012 – 14 November 2014
- Location: Rustenberg (2012–2013) Pretoria (2013–2014)
- Also known as: Farlam Commission
- Participants: Ian Farlam (Chairperson); Pingla Devi Hemraj; Bantubonke Tokota
- Outcome: Report

=== Appointment ===
In late August 2012, President Zuma appointed a commission of inquiry into the events at Marikana, to be chaired by Ian Farlam, a retired judge of the Supreme Court of Appeals. Its mandate was to investigate "matters of public, national and international concern arising out of the tragic incidents at the Lonmin Mine in Marikana" in August. The commission, when it began on 1 October, was seated at the Rustenberg Civic Centre, but later moved to Centurion, Gauteng. Evidence leaders for the commission included advocates Matthew Chaskalson, Mbuyiseli Madlanga, and Geoff Budlender; and the miners were represented by various lawyers, including George Bizos and Dali Mpofu.

Among the first tasks of the commission was a tour of the site of the massacre and nearby settlements. Al Jazeera's Tania Page said that the site had been cleaned since the shootings and that the commission's challenge would be "to see the truth and find an objective balance when all the parties involved have had time to cover their tracks". Indeed, representatives of the miners later alleged before the commission that the police had planted weapons beside the bodies of dead miners after they had been shot.

Although initially scheduled to run for four months, the commission received several extensions and ultimately sat on 300 days, with seven days devoted to oral arguments. It held its last hearing in November 2014. Its report, though submitted to the presidency in March 2015, was not released to the public until 25 June 2015. The total cost of the commission over its lifespan was R153 million.

=== Findings ===
In the view of the commission, the central and decisive cause of the miners' deaths was the decision – taken at the SAPS meeting on 15 August – to enter what the police called the "tactical phase", entailing an attempt on 16 August to disarm and disperse the miners. The commission said that this plan, though it was devised with the reasonable intention of dispersing the strike (and not of causing harm to the strikers), was "prepared in haste", that it should have been clear that it could not be carried out without significant bloodshed, and that it had superseded an alternative plan – to encircle the miners – that had been more carefully prepared and that was "relatively risk-free". In addition, before opening fire, the police should have used tear gas and/or given the strikers an opportunity to surrender. This notwithstanding, the commission said that several shootings at the first scene had been committed in self-defence by officers who had reasonable grounds to believe their lives were under threat – though it noted that at least some of those killed had clearly presented no threat and recommended further investigation into those deaths. The commission did not make individual findings about any of the 17 deaths at the second scene: Farlam wrote that it was still not clear what exactly had happened in the "chaotic free for all" that had transpired there.

South Africa should not have another Marikana. The loss of lives of the strikers, the members of the police, security personnel of Lonmin and employees of Lonmin is to be deeply regretted. The injuries sustained by some of the strikers are also regrettable. Damage to property should not follow expression of any civil disaffection. Bearing arms against a lawful authority should provoke widespread outrage. A career in the police service should not be a death warrant. Those who are found to have been culpable in relation to the criminal acts in the period 9 to 16 August 2012 in Marikana must bear the consequences of their conduct.

— SAPS Heads of Argument, endorsed by the Farlam Commission's report

The commission recommended that the NPA should investigate further several of the killings allegedly committed during the strike. It was critical of both National Police Commissioner Phiyega and North West Police Commissioner Mbombo, recommending inquiries into their fitness to hold office, and it also criticised the conduct of other police commanders on the scene. Farlam said that the police had, at "the highest level", attempted to mislead the public – particularly by failing to report the shooting at the second scene – and the commission itself. However, the report was ambivalent about the role of key political figures, including Police Minister Mthethwa, and it entirely absolved Ramaphosa of wrongdoing. It criticised both the NUM and AMCU for failing to control their members and, in the NUM's case, for giving their members poor advice; and it found that Lonmin had not made sufficient efforts to engage with the miners or to protect its employees. The miners themselves were found partly responsible for having contravened the Regulation of Gatherings Act and the Possession of Dangerous Weapons Act.

== Aftermath ==
Upon the release of the Farlam Commission's report, Phiyega was suspended with full pay until she reached retirement age in 2017; her application to have the commission's findings set aside was dismissed by the Pretoria High Court in 2021. Although an independent panel was set up in 2015 to advise the Minister of Police on how to implement Farlam's recommendations, progress in implementation was slow. In 2022, Farlam himself lamented that the report had not led any public institutions to undertake disciplinary proceedings against state officials. In 2017, IPID handed over 72 dockets to the NPA for prosecution; but, as of August 2022, only "a handful" of police officers had been charged, and all in relation to five deaths on 13 August, with no prosecution of officers involved in the 34 deaths during the massacre on 16 August.

The families of miners arrested, injured, or unlawfully detained during the strikes took the government to court on several occasions, leading to negotiations between the families and government about compensation for damages. As of August 2022, the state had paid more than R70 million to the families of those killed and more than R102 million to 287 workers who were unlawfully arrested; other negotiations were still ongoing. In late 2021, 329 miners sued Ramaphosa – who by then had taken office as President – for his alleged role in the police intervention on 16 August. In July 2022, the Johannesburg High Court ruled that the complainants had not shown any grounds for their claim that Ramaphosa had incited the police to commit murder, but that the case could continue on other grounds.

AMCU organised annual commemorative events at Marikana until at least 2016, and a major commemoration was held on the koppie on the ten-year anniversary of the massacre in 2022. Within a year of the Marikana strike, AMCU was recognised as the majority union at Lonmin, representing over 70 per cent of its workforce as of August 2013.

According to a 2023 study, the massacre led to the creation of a new opposition party and led voters in the areas near to the massacre to switch from the incumbent party to the new party.

== Killing sites ==
Locations of events on 16th near Wonderkop, Marikana
Landmark	Location
Position of over 30 SAPS vehicles and members prior to intervention	25°40′44″S 27°30′34″E
Koppie 1 (Thaba), the primary site occupied by strikers in the week before 16 August	25°40′46″S 27°30′28″E
Koppie 2, also occupied by strikers	25°40′43″S 27°30′27″E
Open area towards which police intended to drive strikers, to be disarmed and arrested	25°40′38″S 27°30′20″E
Scene 1, where 17 strikers were killed during a 12-second-long barrage of live ammunition at cattle kraal (16h00)	25°40′40″S 27°30′33″E
Scene 2, where 17 strikers were killed at small koppie (koppie 3, 16h15–16h26)	25°40′45.8″S 27°30′16.4″E

== In the media ==
Documentaries about the Marikana massacre include eNCA's The Marikana Massacre: Through the Lens (2013); Aryan Kaganof's Night is Coming: A Threnody for the Victims of Marikana (2014); and Rehad Desai's Miners Shot Down (2014), which contains video footage of the shootings and which won an International Emmy.

Books about the massacre include:

- Alexander, Peter; Lekgowa, Thapelo; Mmope, Botsang; et al. (2012). Marikana. A View from the Mountain and a Case to Answer. Johannesburg: Jacana Media. ISBN 978-1-431407330.
- Alexander, Peter; Lekgowa, Thapelo; Mmope, Botsang; et al. (2013). Marikana: Voices from South Africa's Mining Massacre. Ohio University Press. ISBN 978-0-8214-2071-3.
- Marinovich, Greg (2015). Murder at Small Koppie. Johannesburg: Penguin. ISBN 9781770226098.
- Rodny-Gumede, Ylva; Swart, Mia, Eds. (2020). Marikana Unresolved: The Massacre, Culpability and Consequences. Cape Town: University of Cape Town Press. ISBN 978-1775822783.
- Brown, Julian (2022). Marikana: A People's History. Johannesburg: Jacana Media. ISBN 9781431431519.

== See also ==
- 1946 African Mine Workers' Union strike
- Rand Rebellion
