= Marikana =

Marikana (Maretlwane) Rooikoppies Koppies
- Location within North West (South African province) Location within South Africa
- Coordinates: 25.698°S 27.472°E
- Country: South Africa
- Province: North West
- District: Bojanala Platinum
- Municipality: Rustenburg

Area
  - Total: 17.54 km^{2} (6.77 sq mi)

Population (2011)
  - Total: 19,522
  - Density: 1,113/km^{2} (2,883/sq mi)

Racial makeup (2011)
  - Black African: 98.3%
  - Coloured: 0.1%
  - Indian/Asian: 0.5%
  - White: 0.9%
  - Other: 0.2%

First languages (2011)
  - Tswana: 30.0%
  - Xhosa: 29.7%
  - Tsonga: 18.1%
  - Sotho: 14.4%
  - Other: 7.9%
- Time zone: UTC+2 (SAST)
- Postal code (street): 0284
- PO box: 0284
- Area code: 014

Marikana, also known as Rooikoppies, is a town in the Rustenburg Local Municipality, Bojanala Platinum District Municipality in the North West province of South Africa.

The name Rooikoppies means 'red hills' in Afrikaans.

Neighbouring localities include Marikana train station (1 km; 0.62 mi to the north-east), Wonderkop (4 km; 2.5 mi), Ramala, Rietfontein, Rustenburg (29 km; 18 mi); Swaershoek (30 km; 19 mi); Mooinooi (31 km; 19 mi); Brits (36 km; 22 mi); Monakato (38 km; 24 mi); Hartbeespoort (43 km; 27 mi); Kosmos (48 km; 30 mi).

== History ==
The town was laid out in 1870 on the farm Rooikoppies, and the settlement later expanded into seven white-owned farms. In 1933, the Buffelspoort Dam was built, allowing the local farmers to irrigate their crops.

The farming community grew in the 1960s on the back of lucrative tobacco farming, but other diversified farming practices i.e. cattle, maize, chillies, paprika, soya, lusern and sunflower amongst the main groups was the main economic driver of the area. In the 1970s mining was introduced and grew to become the main industry in the region. The main mining activities are PGMs and chrome. Since the introduction of mining activities, the informal and formal population had a growth explosion.

The Marikana massacre of 16 August 2012 and the subsequent killing of 34 workers by police made headlines in the international media.
