= Lindiwe Sidali =

South African doctor

- Born: 1983 (age 42–43); Dutywa
- Citizenship: South Africa
- Education: Rakgatla High School in Wonderkop
- Occupation: cardiothoracic surgeon

Lindiwe Sidali (born 1983) is a South African doctor. She is the first South African woman of African ethnicity to become a cardiothoracic surgeon in South Africa.

== Early years ==
Sidali was born in Dutywa in the Eastern Cape. She grew up in Dutywa and Rusternburg (North West). She had her high school education at Rakgatla High School in Wonderkop, North West. Upon completion of her high school education, she received a scholarship from the North West Department of Health to study medicine in Cuba where she obtained a degree as a doctor of Medicine. She is known to have recently completed her Fellowship of Cardiothoracic Surgery at Inkosi Albert Luthuli Central Hospital in Durban.

== Career ==
She has been a doctor for ten years. In 2018, she became the first South African woman of African ethnicity to become a cardiothoracic surgeon in South Africa. Others have followed her example including Kudzai Kanyepi who is the first female heart surgeon in Zimbabwe. Misogyny was still noted in 2025.
