= Rustenburg Local Municipality =

Rustenburg Metropolitan Rustenburg Local Municipality
- Local municipality
- Seal

- Location in the North West
- Coordinates: 25°40′S 27°20′E
- Country: South Africa
- Province: North West
- District: Bojanala Platinum
- Seat: Rustenburg
- Wards: 45

Government
  - Type: Municipal council
  - Mayor: Sheila Mabale-Huma (ANC)

Area
  - Total: 3,423 km^{2} (1,322 sq mi)

Population (2011)
  - Total: 549,575
  - Density: 160.6/km^{2} (415.8/sq mi)

Racial makeup (2011)
  - Black African: 88.5%
  - Coloured: 0.9%
  - Indian/Asian: 0.8%
  - White: 9.4%

First languages (2011)
  - Tswana: 53.9%
  - Afrikaans: 9.9%
  - Xhosa: 9.6%
  - Tsonga: 5.6%
  - Other: 21%
- Time zone: UTC+2 (SAST)
- Municipal code: NW373

Rustenburg Municipality (Tswana: Mmasepala wa Rustenburg; Afrikaans: Rustenburg Munisipaliteit) is a local municipality within the Bojanala Platinum District Municipality, in the North West province of South Africa. Rustenburg is situated at the foot of the Magalies mountain range. Rustenburg (meaning "town of rest" or "resting place" in Afrikaans) was proclaimed a township in 1851. The city of Rustenburg is situated some 112 km northwest from both Johannesburg and Pretoria. It is a malaria-free area. It is the most populous municipality in the North West province.

Rustenburg is a Dutch name meaning "town (originally castle) of rest".

== Main places ==
The 2001 census divided the municipality into the following main places:

Place	Code	Area (km^{2})	Population	Most spoken language
Bafokeng	60301	1,040.98	132,277	Tswana
Bakwena Ba Magopa	60302	297.74	16,049	Tswana
Baphalane	60303	2.85	3,399	Tswana
Bapo Ba Ga Mogale	60304	29.41	8,412	Tswana
Boitekong	60305	2.15	21,547	Tswana
Hartebeesfontein	60306	5.89	23,965	Tswana
Magaliesberg Nature Reserve	60307	132.58	1,196	Tswana
Mankwe	60308	1.50	1,463	Tswana
Meriting	60309	1.88	10,711	Tswana
Monakato	60310	3.42	7,602	Tswana
Paardekraal Platinum Mine	60312	0.37	24	Xhosa
Paardekraal	60311	1.91	7,215	Tswana
Phatsima	60313	2.23	5,921	Tswana
Rooikoppies	60314	0.46	3,670	Tswana
Rustenburg Part 1	60315	183.39	67,196	Afrikaans
Rustenburg Part 3	60320	2.58	4,662	Tswana
Sunrise Park	60316	2.14	10,312	Tswana
Tlhabane	60317	5.12	31,338	Tswana
Waterval	60318	0.57	979	Afrikaans
Remainder of the municipality (Rustenburg Part 2)	60319	1,774.55	37,581	Tswana

== Politics ==
The municipal council consists of ninety members elected by mixed-member proportional representation. Forty-five councillors are elected by first-past-the-post voting in forty-five wards, while the remaining forty-five are chosen from party lists so that the total number of party representatives is proportional to the number of votes received.

In the election of 4 November 2026 no party won a majority, with the African National Congress (ANC) winning the most seats, thirty-five.

The following table shows the results of the election.

Party	Ward			List			Total seats
Party	Votes	%	Seats	Votes	%	Seats	Total seats
African National Congress	53,986	37.87	35	54,121	38.60	0	35
Democratic Alliance	20,416	14.32	7	20,005	14.27	6	13
Economic Freedom Fighters	18,431	12.93	1	18,976	13.53	11	12
ActionSA	8,099	5.68	0	9,355	6.67	6	6
South African Communist Party	6,852	4.81	0	6,376	4.55	4	4
Freedom Front Plus	4,234	2.97	0	4,774	3.40	3	3
uMkhonto weSizwe Party	4,464	3.13	1	4,226	3.01	2	3
Labour Party	4,148	2.91	0	4,112	2.93	3	3
Seriti Le Kaelo Independent Party	3,732	2.62	1	3,442	2.45	1	2
Rustenburg People's Party	2,325	1.63	0	2,099	1.50	2	2
Lethabong Service Movement	1,951	1.37	0	2,013	1.44	1	1
Independent candidates	3,803	2.67	0				0
Patriotic Alliance	1,567	1.10	0	1,617	1.15	1	1
Badiredi Ba Setšhaba	1,264	0.89	0	1,186	0.85	1	1
Tsogang Civic Movement	747	0.52	0	817	0.58	1	1
African Transformation Movement	631	0.44	0	905	0.65	1	1
Purple Party Ikageng	713	0.50	0	754	0.54	1	1
Bakanana Pele Campaign	552	0.39	0	463	0.33	1	1
25 other parties	4,626	3.25	0	4,972	3.55	0	0
Total	142,541	100.00	45	140,213	100.00	45	90
Valid votes	142,541	97.41		140,213	96.77		
Invalid/blank votes	3,797	2.59		4,677	3.23		
Total votes	146,338	100.00		144,890	100.00		
Registered voters/turnout	324,605	45.08		324,605	44.64		
