= Ian Farlam =

South African judge

The Honourable Ian Farlam SC

Judge of the Supreme Court of Appeal of South Africa
- In office 2000–2009

Judge of the Cape Provincial Division of the Supreme Court of South Africa
- In office 1993–2000

Personal details
- Born: Ian Gordon Farlam Cape Town, Cape Province, Union of South Africa (now Western Cape)
- Education: University of Cape Town
- Profession: Advocate

Ian Farlam SC is a retired South African judge, who chaired the commission of inquiry into the 2012 Marikana massacre.

== Early life and education ==
Farlam was born in Cape Town and obtained his LLB degree from the University of Cape Town in 1961. In that year he was also the clerk of Judge Martin Theron.

== Career ==
He became a prosecutor and worked at the attorney general's office from 1964 until 1968, first in Grahamstown and then in Cape Town. He joined the Cape Bar in 1968 and was awarded Senior Counsel status at the end of 1981.

During 1988, Farlam acted for the first time as a judge in the Orange Free State Provincial Division of the High Court and on 1 October 1993, he was appointed judge of the Cape Provincial Division of the High Court. In 2000 he was appointed as a Judge of Appeal in the Supreme Court of Appeal, a position he held until his retirement in 2009.

== Post-retirement ==
From late 2012, Farlam chaired the commission of inquiry into the Marikana massacre.
