= Labour Party (South Africa, 2024) =

Political party from South Africa

- Leader: Joseph Mathunjwa
- Founded: February 2024
- Colours: Red; Green
- National Assembly seats: 0 / 400
- Provincial Legislatures: 0 / 430

Website
- labourparty.org.za

The Labour Party is a South African political party that emerged from the Association of Mineworkers and Construction Union in 2024.

The party intended to contest the 2024 South African general election but was unable to supply the required signatures in time to do so.

The party contested its first by-elections in December 2024, winning a ward off the African National Congress, as well as an additional PR seat, in the elections held after the dissolution of the Thabazimbi Local Municipality.
