= Thabazimbi Local Municipality elections =

The Thabazimbi Local Municipality is a Local Municipality in Limpopo, South Africa. The council consists of twenty-three members elected by mixed-member proportional representation. Twelve councillors are elected by first-past-the-post voting in twelve wards, while the remaining eleven are chosen from party lists so that the total number of party representatives is proportional to the number of votes received. In the election of 1 November 2021. The African National Congress (ANC) won a plurality of 11 seats on the council.

== Results ==
The following table shows the composition of the council after past elections.

Event	ANC	DA	EFF	FF+	UDM	Other	Total
2000 election	11	2	—	—	1	2	16
2006 election	13	2	—	1	1	3	20
2011 election	16	5	—	1	0	1	23
2016 election	10	5	5	1	0	2	23
2021 election	11	4	2	2	—	4	23
2024 election	10	4	3	2	0	4	23

== December 2000 election ==
The following table shows the results of the 2000 election.

Party	Ward			List			Total seats
Party	Votes	%	Seats	Votes	%	Seats	Total seats
African National Congress	5,659	66.13	8	5,800	67.70	3	11
Thabanorth Inwonersvereniging	1,473	17.21	0	1,045	12.20	2	2
Democratic Alliance	795	9.29	0	1,195	13.95	2	2
United Democratic Movement	472	5.52	0	527	6.15	1	1
Independent candidates	158	1.85	0				0
Total	8,557	100.00	8	8,567	100.00	8	16
Valid votes	8,557	96.97		8,567	97.23		
Invalid/blank votes	267	3.03		244	2.77		
Total votes	8,824	100.00		8,811	100.00		
Registered voters/turnout	25,637	34.42		25,637	34.37		

== March 2006 election ==
The following table shows the results of the 2006 election.

Party	Ward			List			Total seats
Party	Votes	%	Seats	Votes	%	Seats	Total seats
African National Congress	6,853	58.56	6	7,590	74.03	7	13
Democratic Alliance	1,255	10.72	1	1,282	12.50	1	2
Independent candidates	2,402	20.52	3				3
Freedom Front Plus	828	7.08	0	800	7.80	1	1
United Democratic Movement	231	1.97	0	392	3.82	1	1
Pan Africanist Congress of Azania	134	1.15	0	189	1.84	0	0
Total	11,703	100.00	10	10,253	100.00	10	20
Valid votes	11,703	96.98		10,253	85.36		
Invalid/blank votes	364	3.02		1,758	14.64		
Total votes	12,067	100.00		12,011	100.00		
Registered voters/turnout	32,677	36.93		32,677	36.76		

== May 2011 election ==
The following table shows the results of the 2011 election.

Party	Ward			List			Total seats
Party	Votes	%	Seats	Votes	%	Seats	Total seats
African National Congress	10,291	56.19	10	11,769	69.80	6	16
Democratic Alliance	3,292	17.97	1	3,693	21.90	4	5
Independent candidates	3,997	21.82	1				1
Freedom Front Plus	359	1.96	0	337	2.00	1	1
United Democratic Movement	273	1.49	0	383	2.27	0	0
Congress of the People	26	0.14	0	404	2.40	0	0
African People's Convention	25	0.14	0	173	1.03	0	0
Movement Democratic Party	52	0.28	0	101	0.60	0	0
Total	18,315	100.00	12	16,860	100.00	11	23
Valid votes	18,315	97.24		16,860	89.83		
Invalid/blank votes	519	2.76		1,909	10.17		
Total votes	18,834	100.00		18,769	100.00		
Registered voters/turnout	38,917	48.40		38,917	48.23		

== August 2016 election ==
The following table shows the results of the 2016 election.

Party	Ward			List			Total seats
Party	Votes	%	Seats	Votes	%	Seats	Total seats
African National Congress	10,210	45.45	8	10,151	45.15	2	10
Democratic Alliance	4,982	22.18	2	5,002	22.25	3	5
Economic Freedom Fighters	4,469	19.89	2	4,629	20.59	3	5
Thabazimbi Residents Association	1,891	8.42	0	1,878	8.35	2	2
Freedom Front Plus	630	2.80	0	583	2.59	1	1
United Democratic Movement	257	1.14	0	242	1.08	0	0
Independent candidates	25	0.11	0				0
Total	22,464	100.00	12	22,485	100.00	11	23
Valid votes	22,464	98.01		22,485	98.00		
Invalid/blank votes	456	1.99		459	2.00		
Total votes	22,920	100.00		22,944	100.00		
Registered voters/turnout	45,209	50.70		45,209	50.75		

== November 2021 election ==
The following table shows the results of the 2021 election.

Party	Ward			List			Total seats
Party	Votes	%	Seats	Votes	%	Seats	Total seats
African National Congress	8,845	47.34	11	8,827	47.46	0	11
Democratic Alliance	2,872	15.37	1	2,834	15.24	3	4
Thabazimbi Residents Association	2,031	10.87	0	2,077	11.17	3	3
Economic Freedom Fighters	1,929	10.32	0	1,940	10.43	2	2
Freedom Front Plus	1,724	9.23	0	1,641	8.82	2	2
Thabazimbi Forum for Service Delivery	604	3.23	0	665	3.58	1	1
Defenders of the People	300	1.61	0	385	2.07	0	0
African Christian Democratic Party	118	0.63	0	107	0.58	0	0
African Transformation Movement	102	0.55	0	123	0.66	0	0
Independent candidates	159	0.85	0				0
Total	18,684	100.00	12	18,599	100.00	11	23
Valid votes	18,684	98.61		18,599	98.62		
Invalid/blank votes	263	1.39		260	1.38		
Total votes	18,947	100.00		18,859	100.00		
Registered voters/turnout	45,688	41.47		45,688	41.28		

== December 2024 election ==
The municipality was dissolved due to dysfunctionality, and a full set of elections, ward and PR, were held to elect a new council in December 2024.

The following table shows the results of the election.

Party	Ward			List			Total seats
Party	Votes	%	Seats	Votes	%	Seats	Total seats
African National Congress	7,766	39.21	10	7,943	40.09	0	10
Democratic Alliance	3,172	16.02	1	3,251	16.41	3	4
Economic Freedom Fighters	2,626	13.26	0	2,652	13.39	3	3
Labour Party	1,682	8.49	1	1,722	8.69	1	2
Freedom Front Plus	1,444	7.29	0	1,363	6.88	2	2
uMkhonto weSizwe	666	3.36	0	680	3.43	1	1
Thabazimbi Residents Association	316	1.60	0	447	2.26	1	1
United Resident's Party	378	1.91	0	379	1.91	0	0
Patriotic Alliance	271	1.37	0	322	1.63	0	0
African Independent Congress	199	1.00	0	206	1.04	0	0
Inkatha Freedom Party	188	0.95	0	194	0.98	0	0
Thabazimbi Forum for Service Delivery	144	0.73	0	152	0.77	0	0
Bolsheviks Party of South Africa	149	0.75	0	143	0.72	0	0
Defenders of the People	74	0.37	0	81	0.41	0	0
African Congress for Transformation	55	0.28	0	76	0.38	0	0
South African Security Organisation	59	0.30	0	29	0.15	0	0
African Heart Congress	46	0.23	0	40	0.20	0	0
Defenders of African Dignity	39	0.20	0	38	0.19	0	0
United Democratic Movement	37	0.19	0	38	0.19	0	0
African Transformation Movement	38	0.19	0	34	0.17	0	0
Pan Africanist Congress of Azania	18	0.09	0	22	0.11	0	0
Independent candidates	437	2.21	0				0
Total	19,804	100.00	12	19,812	100.00	11	23
Valid votes	19,804	98.53		19,812	98.47		
Invalid/blank votes	295	1.47		308	1.53		
Total votes	20,099	100.00		20,120	100.00		
Registered voters/turnout	51,399	39.10		51,399	39.14		
