= Lonmin =

British mining company in South Africa

Lonmin plc
- Formerly: Lonrho plc
- Type: Public limited company
- Traded as: LSE:LMI, JSE:LON
- Industry: Mining
- Founded: 1909 (as the London and Rhodesian Mining and Land Company Limited)
- Defunct: 2019
- Fate: Acquired by Sibanye-Stillwater
- Headquarters: London, England, UK
- Key people: Brian Beamish (Chairman); Ben Magara (CEO); Barrie van der Merwe (CFO); Mahomed Seedat (COO)
- Products: Platinum group metals
- Revenue: US$965 million (2014)
- Operating income: US$52 million (2014)
- Net income: US$(203) million (2014)
- Website: www.lonmin.com

Lonmin plc, formerly Lonrho plc, was a British producer of platinum group metals operating in the Bushveld Complex of South Africa. It was listed on the London Stock Exchange. Its registered office was in London, and its operational headquarters were in Johannesburg, South Africa.

Lonmin rose to international attention following the Marikana miners' strike in August 2012, in which over 100 striking Lonmin employees were shot (36 killed and 78 wounded) by South African Police Service officers. On 10 June 2019, Sibanye-Stillwater completed the acquisition of Lonmin plc.

== History ==
The company was incorporated in the United Kingdom on 13 May 1909 as the London and Rhodesian Mining and Land Company Limited. It had a founding capital of £1300, which was raised by seven shareholders. Led by Julius Weil, the company started to invest in mining rights in Rhodesia. In 1912 Lonrho started to invest in farming land as well and by 1945 it had become Rhodesia's biggest company.

Businessman Tiny Rowland was recruited as chief executive in 1962. For many years during the second half of the twentieth century it was frequently in the news, not only due to the politically sensitive part of the world in which it had mining businesses, but also – as it strove to become a conglomerate not wholly dependent on these businesses – in a number of takeover battles, most notably for the Harrods of Knightsbridge department store.

In 1968, Lonrho acquired Ashanti Goldfields Corporation, a gold mining business in Ghana. The former Conservative minister Duncan Sandys, a director of Ashanti, became Lonrho's chairman in 1972.

Sir Angus Ogilvy, married to a member of the British royal family (Princess Alexandra), was a Lonrho director and this increased media interest in the company's affairs. Ogilvy's career ended when Lonrho was involved in a sanctions-busting scandal concerning trade with Rhodesia. Prime Minister, Edward Heath, criticised the company, describing it in the House of Commons in 1973 as "an unpleasant and unacceptable face of capitalism."

By 1979, Lonrho employed 140,000 people worldwide.

During the 1980s, Lonrho entered the British newspaper market, buying the Sunday newspaper The Observer in 1981 and the newly launched daily Today in 1986. Today was sold to News International the following year, while the Guardian Media Group bought the Observer in 1993.

Tiny Rowland was finally ejected from Lonrho in October 1993 after a boardroom tussle with director Dieter Bock. He was replaced by Nick Morrell, a former chief executive of The Observer.

Two months before Rowland's death (on 26 July 1998) the assets of Lonrho were split. Two publicly listed companies, Lonrho plc and Lonrho Africa plc were created – the former retaining all the non-African businesses and mining assets. In 1999, Lonrho plc was renamed as Lonmin plc and a new era as a focused mining company began. In 2000 Gordon Haslem became CEO.

In 2004 Brad Mills became CEO: Mills in turn announced his intention to resign from his position in 2008. Mills leaves behind a "significant contribution in developing the company over the past four years" according to chairperson, Sir John Craven, as his introduction of mechanized mining has increased safety for the miners, as well as increasing productivity. Lonmin indicated that former chief strategic officer responsible for the company's business development, Ian Farmer, would replace him.

On 1 October 2008, after building a 24.9% stake in Lonmin, Xstrata announced it was not proceeding with a takeover pitched at £33 per Lonmin share, blaming the failure of its bid on "unprecedented uncertainty in financial markets" caused by the 2008 financial crisis. Xstrata and its 24.9% stake in Lonmin was later acquired by Glencore on 2 May 2013. Glencore announced on 11 February 2015 that it intends to divest its 23.9% stake in Lonmin, which it inherited through the acquisition of Xstrata. Glencore's divestment in Lonmin will be implemented by way of a distribution in specie to Glencore shareholders.

Farmer resigned as CEO in 2012 for health reasons.

In October 2017, the Mining Forum of South Africa (MFSA) and Bapo ba Mogale Investments (BBMI) pleaded to President Jacob Zuma to suspend Lonmin's operating licence over non-compliance with its social and labour plan (SLP) for the years 2014 to 2018.

In 2019, Lonmin was acquired by Sibanye-Stillwater.

== Operations ==
The Company was a producer of platinum group metals operating mainly in the Bushveld Complex in South Africa. It had two multi-shaft mining operations, located respectively in:

- Marikana Region
- Limpopo Region

	role	salary	bonus	total
Ian P. Farmer	Chief Executive Officer	£351,538	£213,990	£565,528
Alan Ferguson	Chief Financial Officer	£422,500	£366,344	£788,844

== Strikes ==
=== Marikana miners' strike ===
At the Marikana platinum mines, operated by Lonmin at Marikana near Rustenburg, 3,000 workers walked off the job on 10 August 2012 after Lonmin failed to meet with workers. The event garnered international attention following a series of violent incidents which began when leaders from the National Union of Mineworkers (NUM) allegedly opened fire on striking NUM members on 11 August.

The Marikana Massacre, as referred to in the media, occurred when police broke up an occupation by striking Lonmin workers of a 'koppie' (hilltop) near Nkaneng shack settlement in Marikana on Thursday 16 August 2012. As a result of the police shootings, 34 miners died and an additional 78 miners were injured causing anger and outcry against the police and South African government. Further controversy emerged after it was discovered that most of the victims were shot in the back and many victims were shot far from police lines. The violence on 16 August 2012 was the single most lethal use of force by South African security forces against civilians since the end of the apartheid era.

During the Marikana Commission, it also emerged that Lonmin management solicited Lonmin shareholder and ANC heavyweight, Cyril Ramaphosa, to coordinate "concomitant action" against "criminal" protesters and is seen by many as therefore being responsible for the massacre. Submissions by the South African Police Service accused Lonmin of being responsible for the violence because of their failure to negotiate with striking miners.

=== 2014 South African platinum strike ===
In late January 2014 thousands of employees belonging to Lonmin went on strike, demanding a basic salary of R12,500 ($1,180). This amount excludes so-called "living out allowances", for staff who choose not to stay in mine housing on the mine property. This is the same salary for which striking miners were shot and killed by the South African Police Service (SAPS) in 2012. Most of the miners belonged to the miners' union 'AMCU' which South African politician and Commander in Chief of the Economic Freedom Fighters had vowed to sponsor in order to allow the miners to continue striking. The platinum miners were mainly based in Marikana, the town in which Julius Malema jump-started his political party and gained popularity with most of the miners.

The strike, the longest in the history of South Africa, ended in late June 2014 when the mineworkers union signed a 3-year settlement deal with the mine owners which saw the lowest paid workers, whose basic salary was less than R12,500, increased by R1,000 ($95) a month for two years, and by R950 per month in the third year. The agreement also ensured no platinum worker would earn less than R8,000 as a basic salary.

== See also ==
- Lonrho
