= Monakato =

- Location within North West (South African province) Location within South Africa
- Coordinates: 25°21′11.81″S 27°15′27.73″E
- Country: South Africa
- Province: North West
- District: Bojanala
- Municipality: Rustenburg

Area
  - Total: 4.06 km^{2} (1.57 sq mi)

Population (2011)
  - Total: 8,076
  - Density: 1,990/km^{2} (5,150/sq mi)

Racial makeup (2011)
  - Black African: 99.08%
  - Indian/Asian: 0.30%
  - Coloured: 0.24%
  - White: 0.20%
  - Other: 0.19%

First languages (2011)
  - Tswana: 87.69%
  - Zulu: 2.74%
  - Xhosa: 2.28%
  - Tsonga language: 1.63%
  - English: 1.55%
- Time zone: UTC+2 (SAST)
- Postal code (street): 0325
- PO box: 0325
- Area code: 014

Monakato is a town in the North West province of South Africa.
