= Joseph Mathunjwa =

South African trade unionist

- Born: 26 May 1965; Amathikulu, KwaZulu-Natal
- Occupation: Trade union leader
- Known for: Marikana miners' strike

Joseph Mathunjwa (born 26 May 1965) is the head of the Association of Mineworkers and Construction Union (AMCU).

== Early life and career ==
Mathunjwa was born in Amathikulu, northern KwaZulu-Natal, South Africa and his first job was as a Laboratory Attendant in 1986 at Rand Coal where he earned between R300 and R400 a month. His interest in trade unions came when he saw people being retrenched without companies making an effort to save their jobs, The first retrenchment that he fought through the Labour Court was at BHP Billiton in 2005 and he won the case that was him and AMCU's starting point.

In August 2022, during a speech Mathunjwa said that South Africa was more functional during Apartheid under white people, than it currently is.

== Personal life ==
Mathunjwa is a Christian and attends the Salvation Army. He can play the trumpet and can also read music. He is also a singer.
