= Mining Weekly =

South African trade magazine

- Publishing Editor: Martin Creamer
- Frequency: Weekly
- Publisher: Creamer Media
- Total circulation: Each week, 10,271 copies are circulated and read by 66,761 readers
- First issue: 1995
- Country: South Africa
- Based in: Johannesburg, South Africa
- Website: miningweekly.com

Mining Weekly is a weekly South African trade magazine covering the mining industry across Africa.

== History and profile ==
Mining Weekly was first published in 1995 by Creamer Media, an independent publishing company based in Johannesburg, South Africa. The company was founded by Martin Creamer in 1981. The company's other weekly news magazine, Engineering News, began publication in 1981.

The latest news and developments in several mining sectors are available to readers of the magazine and visitors to the website, including base metals, coal, diamonds, ferrous metals, gold, platinum, silver, and uranium. Key service areas and topics related to the mining industry, such as health and safety, and legislative and environmental aspects, are reported on daily.
