= Wonderkop =

- Location within North West (South African province) Location within South Africa
- Coordinates: 25.669°S 27.524°E
- Country: South Africa
- Province: North West
- District: Bojanala Platinum
- Municipality: Madibeng
- Main Place: Wonderkoppies

Area
  - Total: 3.76 km^{2} (1.45 sq mi)

Population (2011)
  - Total: 17,461
  - Density: 4,640/km^{2} (12,000/sq mi)

Racial makeup (2011)
  - Black African: 98.1%
  - Coloured: 0.2%
  - Indian/Asian: 0.2%
  - White: 0.5%
  - Other: 0.9%

First languages (2011)
  - Xhosa: 42.0%
  - Tsonga: 17.6%
  - Tswana: 14.3%
  - Sotho: 11.4%
  - Other: 14.6%
- Time zone: UTC+2 (SAST)
- PO box: 0317

Wonderkop is a town in Bojanala District Municipality in the North West province of South Africa.
