= Lithology =

Description of the physical characteristics of a rock unit

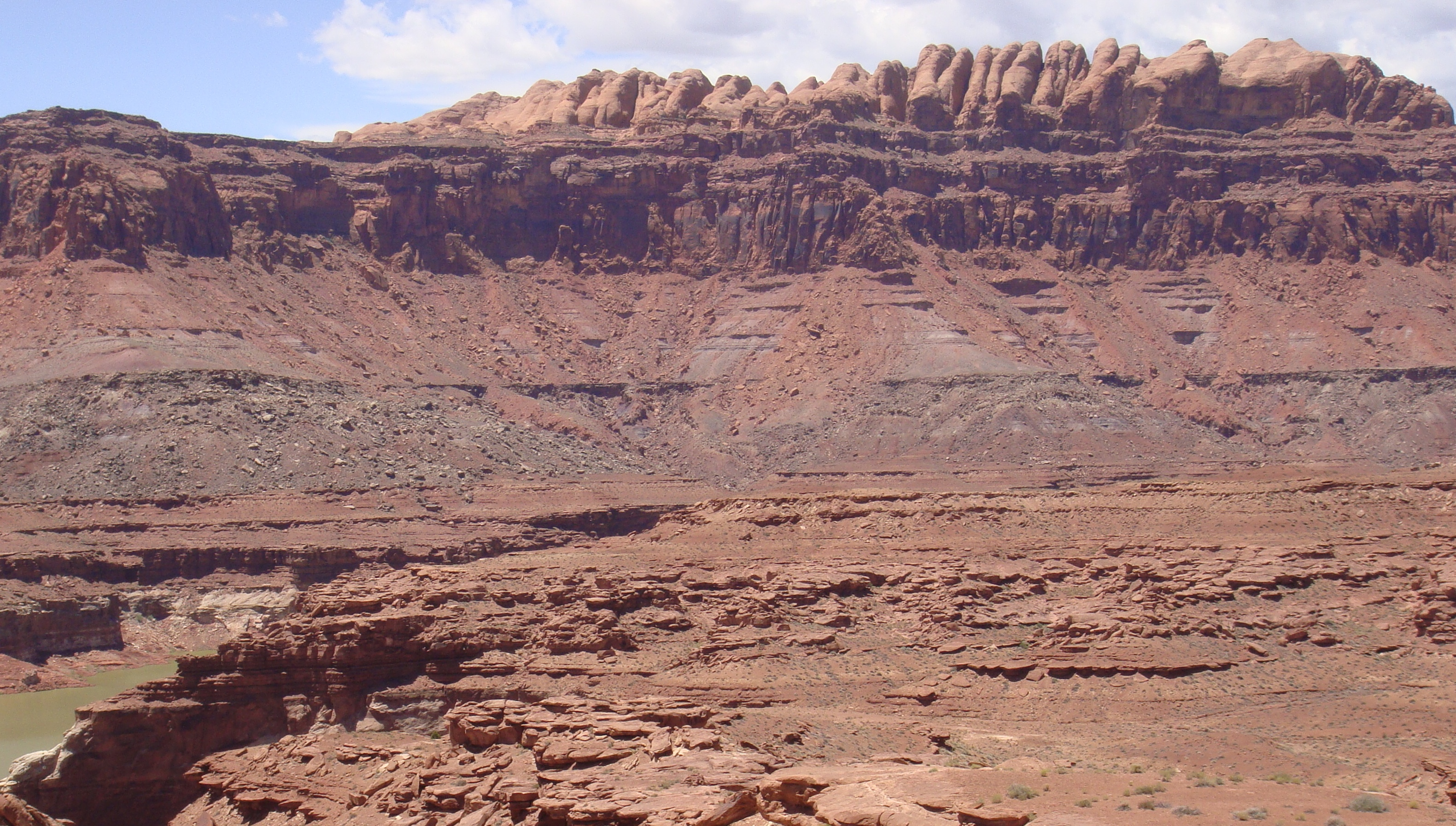
Stratigraphy as seen in southeastern Utah

The lithology of a rock unit is a description of its physical characteristics visible at outcrop, in hand or core samples, or with low magnification microscopy. Physical characteristics include colour, texture, grain size, and composition. Lithology may refer to either a detailed description of these characteristics, or a summary of the gross physical character of a rock. Examples of lithologies in the second sense include sandstone, slate, basalt, or limestone.

Lithology is the basis of subdividing rock sequences into individual lithostratigraphic units for the purposes of mapping and correlation between areas. In certain applications, such as site investigations, lithology is described using a standard terminology such as in the European geotechnical standard Eurocode 7.

== Rock type ==
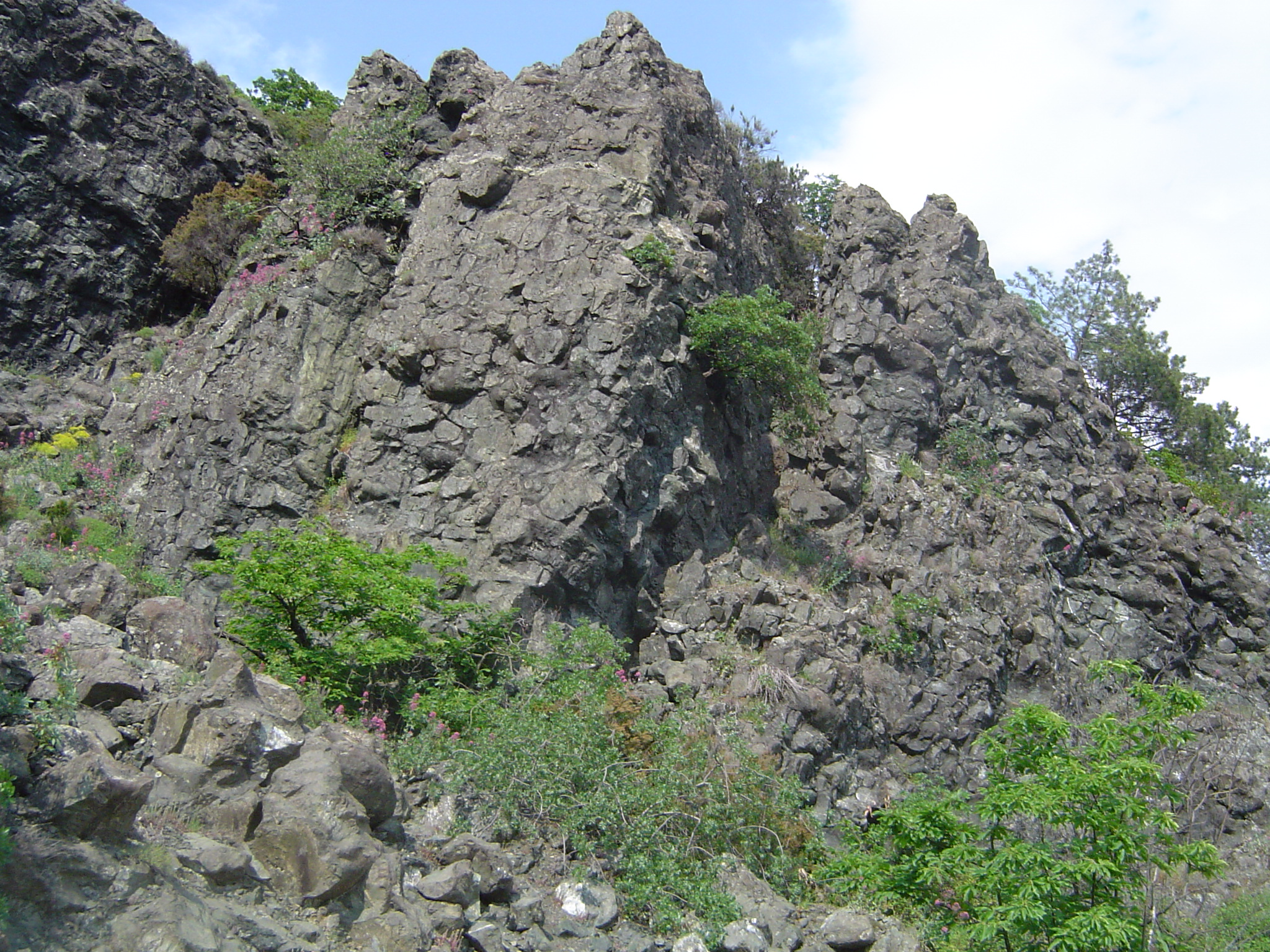
A basalt, showing the 'pillow' lava shape characteristic of underwater eruptions, Italy

The naming of a lithology is based on the rock type. The three major rock types are igneous, sedimentary, and metamorphic. Igneous rocks are formed directly from magma, which is a mixture of molten rock, dissolved gases, and solid crystals. Sedimentary rock is formed from mineral or organic particles that collect at the Earth's surface and become lithified. Metamorphic rock forms by recrystallization of existing solid rock under conditions of great heat or pressure.

Igneous rocks are further broken into three broad categories. Igneous rock composed of broken rock fragments created directly by volcanic processes (tephra) are classified as pyroclastic rock. Pyroclastic rocks are further classified by average fragment (clast) size and whether the fragments are mostly individual mineral crystals, particles of volcanic glass, or rock fragments. Further classifications, such as by chemical composition, may also be applied. Igneous rocks that have visible mineral grains (phaneritic rocks) are classified as intrusive, while those that are glassy or very fine-grained (aphanitic) are classified as extrusive rock. Intrusive igneous rocks are usually classified using the QAPF classification, which is based on the relative content of quartz, alkali feldspar, plagioclase, and feldspathoid. Special classifications exist for igneous rock of unusual compositions, such as ultramafic rock or carbonatites. Where possible, extrusive igneous rocks are also classified by mineral content using the extrusive QAPF classification, but when determining the mineral composition is impractical, they may be classified chemically using the TAS classification. This is based on the total content of silica and alkali metal oxides and other chemical criteria.

Sedimentary rocks are further classified by whether they are siliciclastic or carbonate. Siliciclastic sedimentary rocks are then subcategorized based on their grain size distribution and the relative proportions of quartz, feldspar, and lithic (rock) fragments. Carbonate rocks are classified with the Dunham or Folk classification schemes according to the constituents of the carbonate rock.

Metamorphic rock naming can be based on protolith, mineral composition, texture, or metamorphic facies. Naming based on texture and a pelite (e.g., shale, mudrock) protolith can be used to define slate and phyllite. Texture-based names are schist and gneiss. These textures, from slate to gneiss, define a continually-increasing extent of metamorphism. Metamorphic facies are defined by the pressure-temperature fields in which particular minerals form. Additional metamorphic rock names exist, such as greenschist (metamorphosed basalt and other extrusive igneous rock) or quartzite (metamorphosed quartz sand).

== Grain/clast size ==
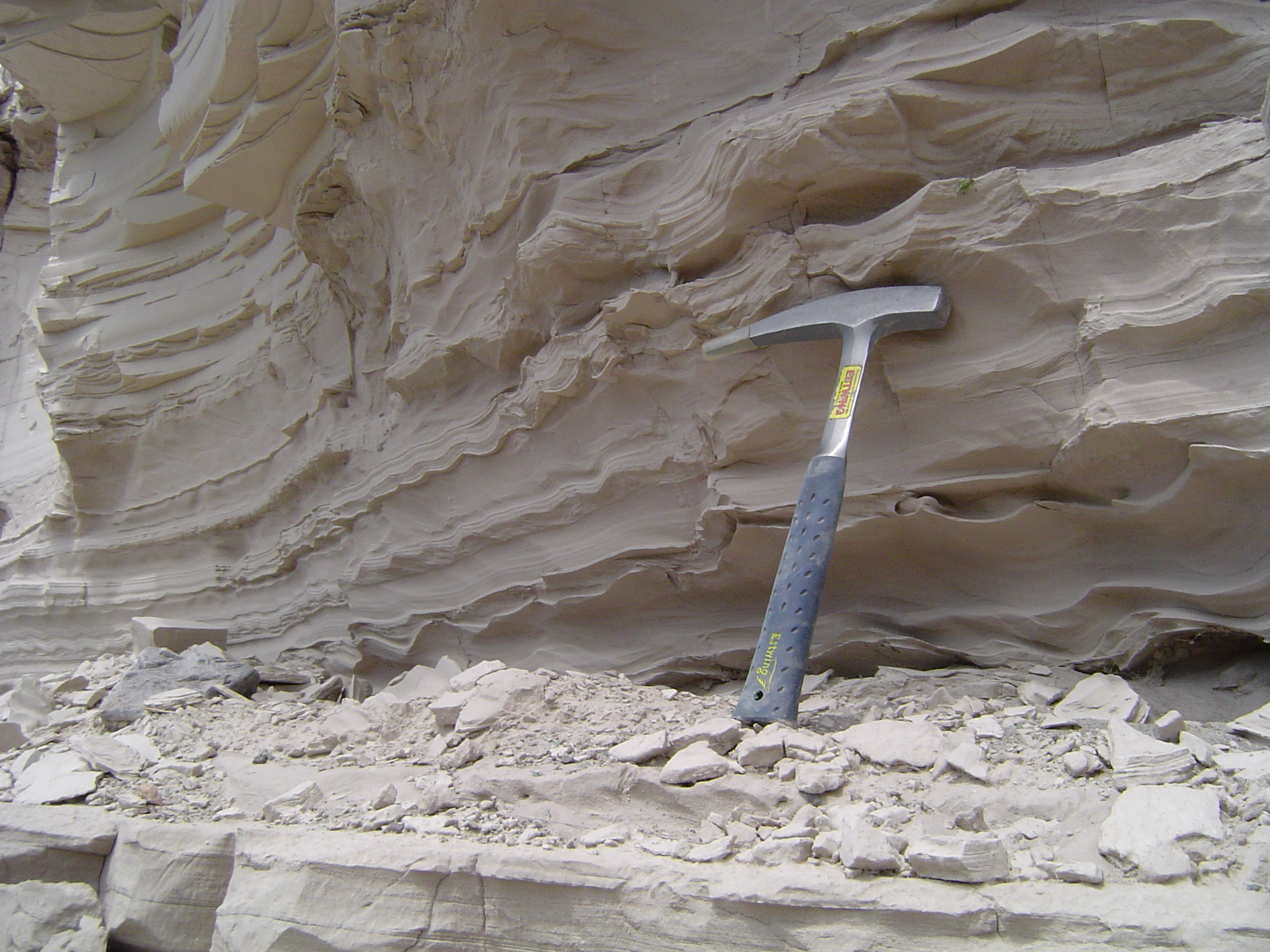
A claystone, the finest-grained sedimentary rock, deposited in Glacial Lake Missoula, Montana

In igneous and metamorphic rocks, grain size is a measure of the sizes of the crystals in the rock. In igneous rock, this is used to determine the rate at which the material cooled: large crystals typically indicate intrusive igneous rock, while small crystals indicate that the rock was extrusive. Metamorphism of rock composed of mostly a single mineral, such as quartzite or marble, may increase grain size (grain growth), while metamorphism of sheared rock may decrease grain size (syntectonic recrystallization).

In clastic sedimentary rocks, grain size is the diameter of the grains and/or clasts that constitute the rock. These are used to determine which rock naming system to use (e.g., a conglomerate, sandstone, or mudstone). In the case of sandstones and conglomerates, which cover a wide range of grain sizes, a word describing the grain size range is added to the rock name. Examples are "pebble conglomerate" and "fine quartz arenite".

== Mineralogy ==
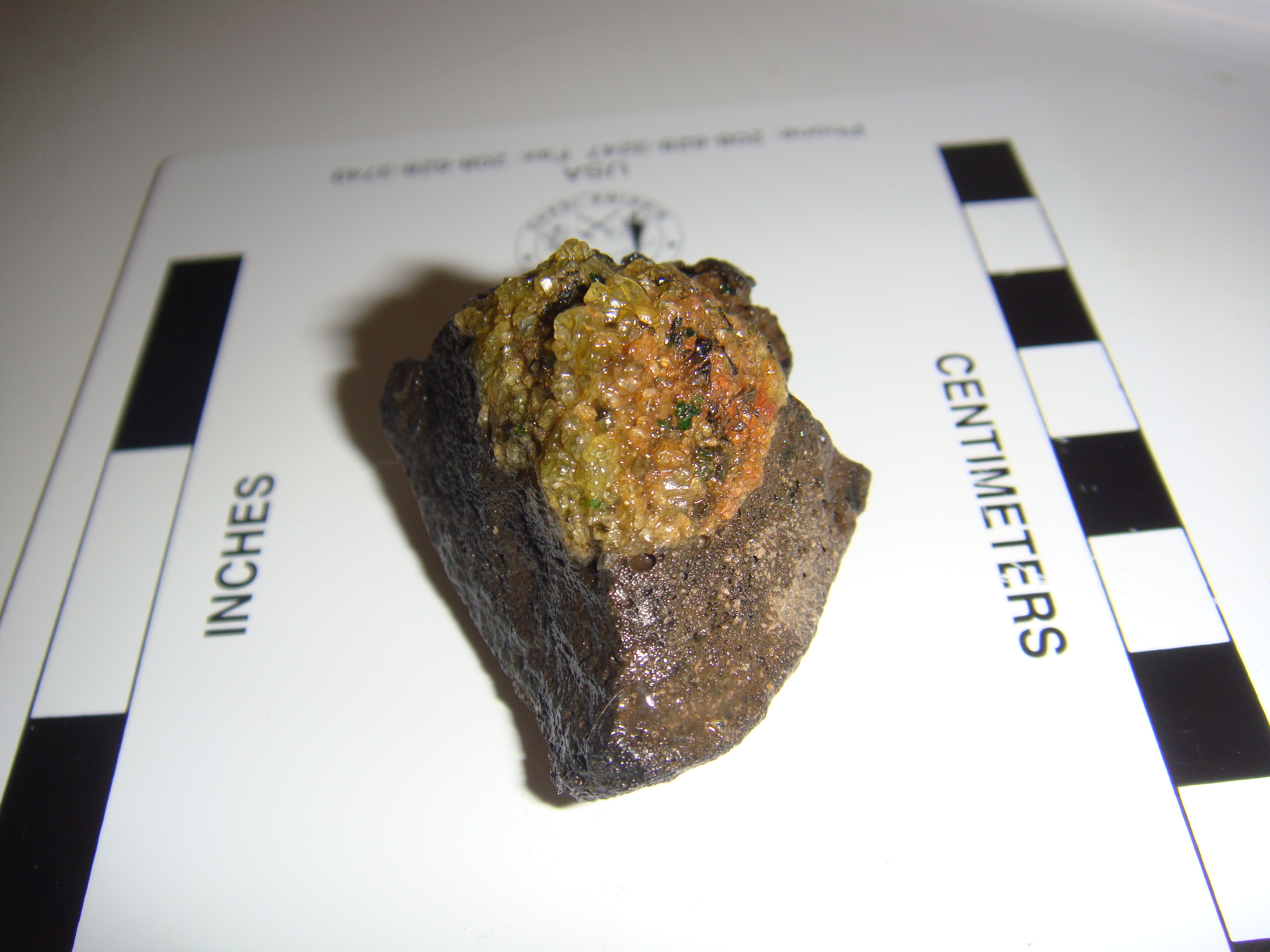
An ultramafic mantle xenolith with olivine and pyroxene (altering brown to iddingsite) in a matrix of mafic basalt scoria

In rocks in which mineral grains are large enough to be identified using a hand lens, the visible mineralogy is included as part of the description. In the case of sequences possibly including carbonates, calcite-cemented rocks or those with possible calcite veins, it is normal to test for the presence of calcite (or other forms of calcium carbonate) using dilute hydrochloric acid and looking for effervescence.

The mineralogical composition of a rock is one of the major ways in which it is classified. Igneous rocks are classified by their mineral content whenever practical, using the QAPF classification or special ultramafic or carbonatite classifications. Likewise metamorphic facies, which show the degree to which a rock has been exposed to heat and pressure and are therefore important in classifying metamorphic rocks, are determined by observing the mineral phases that are present in a sample.

== Colour ==
The colour of a rock or its component parts is a distinctive characteristic of some rocks and is always recorded, sometimes against standard colour charts, such as that produced by the Rock-Color Chart Committee of the Geological Society of America based on the Munsell color system.

== Fabric ==
The fabric of a rock describes the spatial and geometric configuration of all the elements that make it up. In sedimentary rocks the main visible fabric is normally bedding, and the scale and degree of development of the bedding is normally recorded as part of the description. Metamorphic rocks (apart from those created by contact metamorphism), are characterised by well-developed planar and linear fabrics. Igneous rocks may also have fabrics as a result of flow or the settling out of particular mineral phases during crystallisation, forming cumulates.

== Texture ==
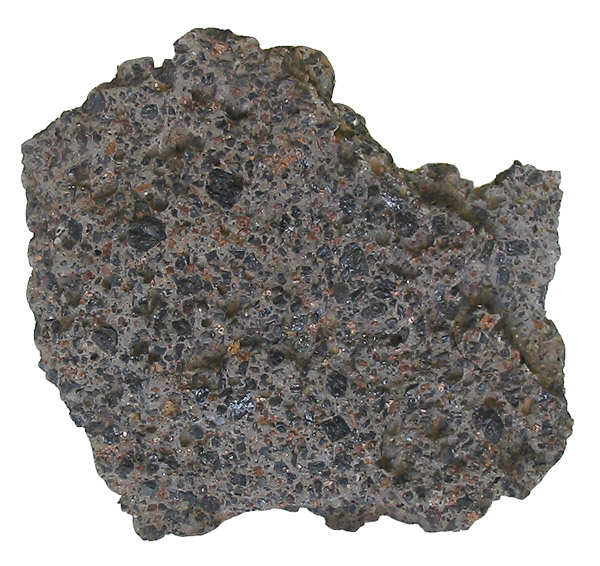
The lithology of this porphyritic basalt is characterized by olivine and augite phenocrysts.

The texture of a rock describes the relationship between the individual grains or clasts that make up the rock. Sedimentary textures include the degree of sorting, grading, shape and roundness of the clasts. Metamorphic textures include those referring to the timing of growth of large metamorphic minerals relative to a phase of deformation—before deformation porphyroclast—after deformation porphyroblast. Igneous textures include such properties as grain shape, which varies from crystals with ideal crystal shapes (euhedral) to irregular crystals (anhedral), whether the rock shows highly nonuniform crystal sizes (is porphyritic), or whether grains are aligned (which is described as trachytic texture).

== Small-scale structures ==
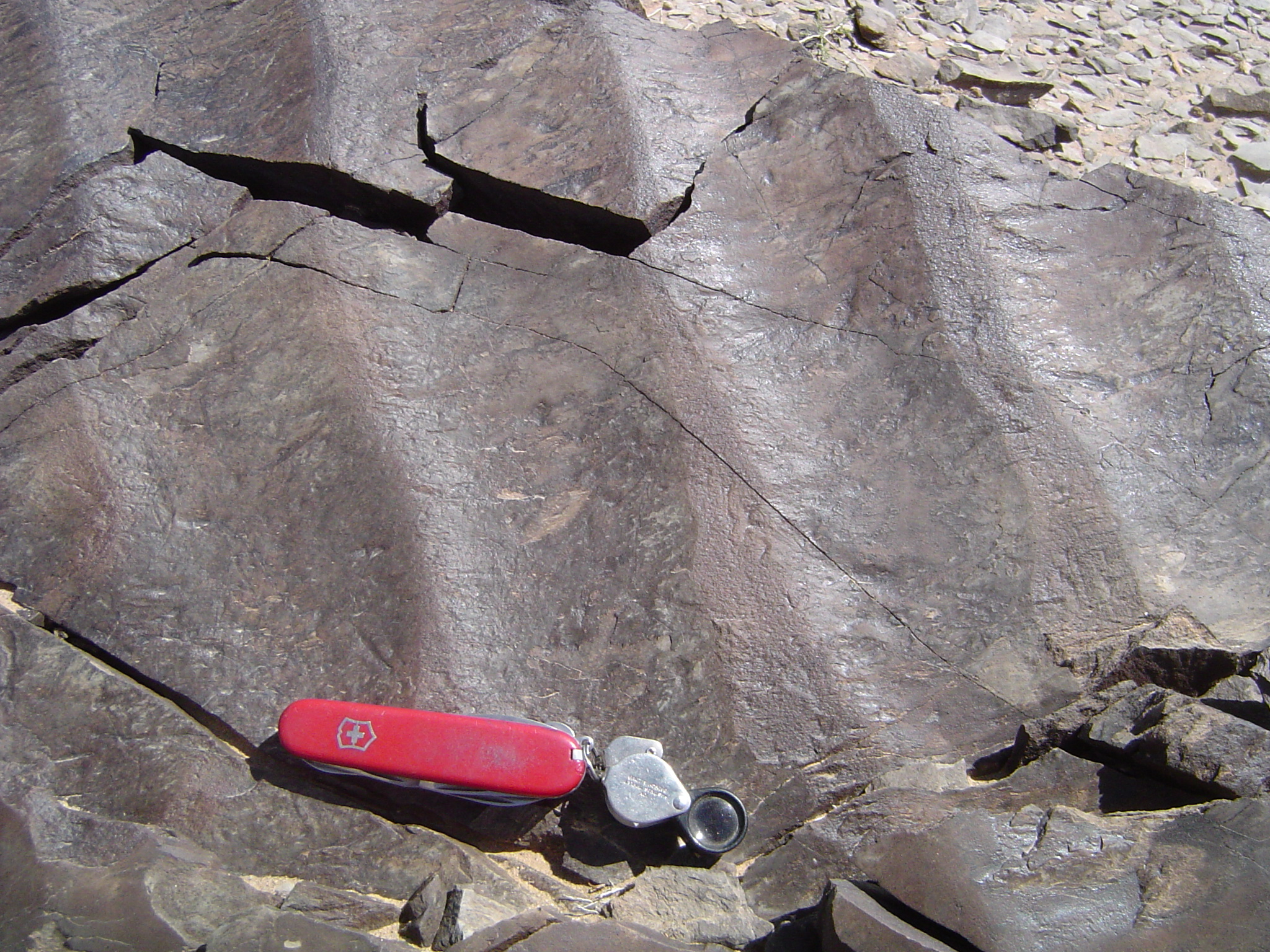
Ripple marks from Mongolia

Rocks often contain small-scale structures (smaller than the scale of an individual outcrop). In sedimentary rocks this may include sole markings, ripple marks, mudcracks and cross-bedding. These are recorded as they are generally characteristic of a particular depositional environment and may provide information on paleocurrent directions. In metamorphic rocks associated with the deeper levels of fault zones, small scale structures such as asymmetric boudins and microfolds are used to determine the sense of displacement across the zone. In igneous rocks, small-scale structures are mostly observed in lavas such as pahoehoe versus ʻAʻā basaltic flows, and pillows showing eruption within a body of water or beneath ice.

== Surficial lithology ==
Unconsolidated surficial materials may also be given a lithology. This is defined by grain size and composition and is often attached to an interpretation of how the unit formed. Surficial lithologies can be given to lacustrine, coastal, fluvial, aeolian, glacial, and recent volcanic deposits, among others. Examples of surficial lithology classifications used by the U.S. Geological Survey are, "Glacial Till, Loamy", "Saline Lake Sediment", and "Eolian Sediment, Coarse-Textured (Sand Dunes)".
