= Igneous textures =

Property of igneous rocks

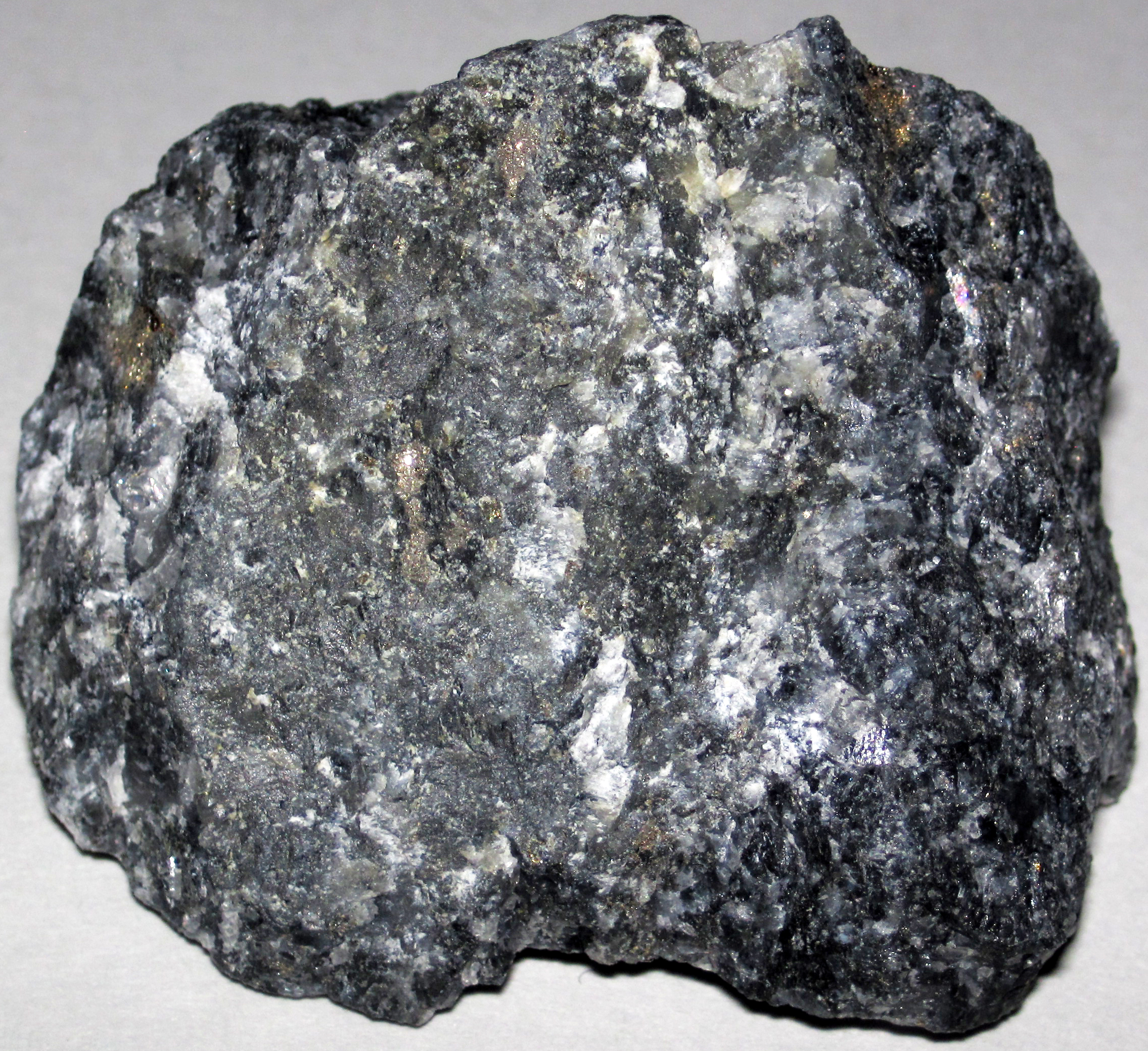
Phaneritic rock: Anorthosite from the Stillwater Igneous Complex (Neoarchean; Montana)

Igneous textures include the rock textures occurring in igneous rocks. Igneous textures are used by geologists in determining the mode of origin of igneous rocks and are used in rock classification. The six main types of textures are phaneritic, aphanitic, porphyritic, glassy, pyroclastic, and pegmatitic.

Aphanitic (a = not, phaner = visible) rocks, in contrast to phaneritic rocks, typically form from lava which crystallize rapidly on or near Earth's surface. When extrusive rocks make contact with the atmosphere they cool quickly, so the minerals do not have time to form large crystals. The individual crystals in an aphanitic igneous rock are not distinguishable to the naked eye. Examples of aphanitic igneous rock include basalt, andesite, and rhyolite.

Glassy or vitreous textures occur during some volcanic eruptions when the lava is quenched so rapidly that crystallization cannot occur. The result is a natural amorphous glass with few or no crystals. Examples include obsidian.

Pegmatitic texture occurs during magma cooling when some minerals may grow so large that they become massive (the size ranges from a few centimetres to several metres). This is typical of pegmatites. Pegmatites are most commonly formed as coarse-grained igneous rocks of granitic composition, containing large clasts of gemstones such as amazonite, garnet, and topaz.

Phaneritic (phaner = visible) textures are typical of intrusive igneous rocks, these rocks crystallized slowly below Earth's surface. As magma cools slowly the minerals have time to grow and form large crystals. The minerals in a phaneritic igneous rock are sufficiently large to see each individual crystal with the naked eye. Examples of phaneritic igneous rocks are gabbro, diorite, and granite.

Porphyritic textures develop when conditions during the cooling of magma change relatively quickly. The earlier formed minerals will have formed slowly and remain as large crystals, whereas, sudden cooling causes the rapid crystallization of the remainder of the melt into a fine-grained (aphanitic) matrix. The result is an aphanitic rock with some larger crystals (phenocrysts) embedded within its matrix. Porphyritic texture also occurs when magma crystallizes below a volcano but is erupted before completing crystallization thus forcing the remaining lava to crystallize more rapidly with much smaller crystals.

Pyroclastic (pyro = igneous, clastic = fragment) textures occur when explosive eruptions blast the lava into the air resulting in fragmental, typically glassy material which falls as volcanic ash, lapilli, and volcanic bombs.
