= Granodiorite =

Type of coarse grained intrusive igneous rock

- Igneous rock
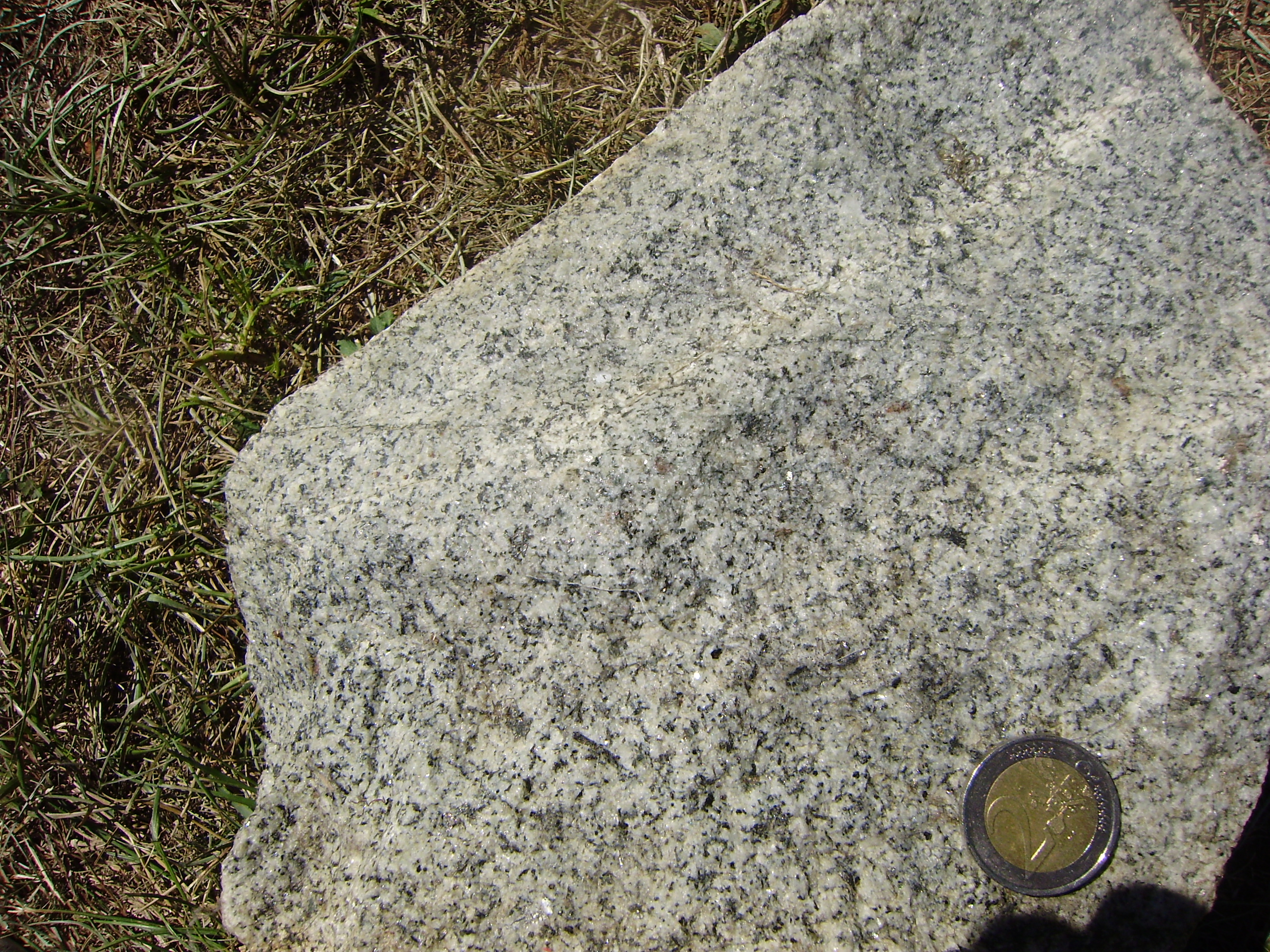
- A sample of granodiorite from the Massif Central, France

Composition
- Classification: Felsic
- Primary: potassium feldspar (10-35%), plagioclase feldspar, and quartz
- Secondary: muscovite, biotite, pyroxene, and hornblende
- Texture: Phaneritic
- Equivalents: Dacite (extrusive)

QAPF diagram for classification of plutonic rocks. The composition field for granodiorite is indicated in blue.

Mineral assemblage of igneous rocks

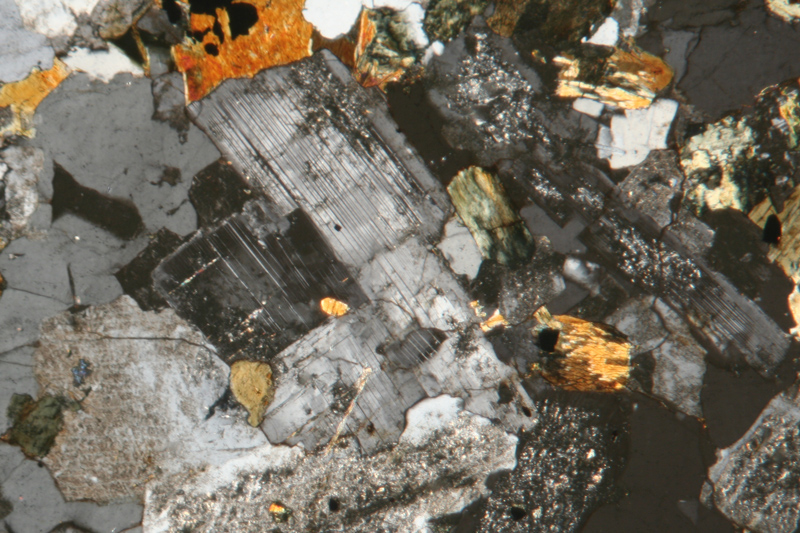
Photomicrograph of thin section of granodiorite from Slovakia (in crossed polarised light)

Granodiorite (/ˌɡrænoʊˈdaɪ.əraɪt, ˌɡrænəˈ-/ GRAN-oh-DY-ə-ryte, GRAN-ə-) is a coarse-grained (phaneritic) intrusive igneous rock similar to granite, but containing more plagioclase feldspar than orthoclase feldspar.

The term banatite is sometimes used informally for various rocks ranging from granite to diorite, including granodiorite. The term granodiorite was first used by G. F. Becker (1893) to describe granitic rocks in the Sierra Nevada, United States.

== Composition ==
According to the QAPF diagram, granodiorite has a greater than 20% quartz by volume, and between 65% and 90% of the feldspar is plagioclase. A greater amount of plagioclase would designate the rock as tonalite.

Granodiorite is felsic to intermediate in composition. It is the intrusive igneous equivalent of the extrusive igneous dacite. It contains a large amount of sodium (Na) and calcium (Ca) rich plagioclase, potassium feldspar, quartz, and minor amounts of muscovite mica as the lighter colored mineral components. Amphiboles (often in the form of hornblende), and biotite are more abundant in granodiorite than in granite, giving it a more distinct two-toned or overall darker appearance. Mica may be present in well-formed hexagonal crystals, and hornblende may appear as needle-like crystals. Minor amounts of oxide minerals such as magnetite, ilmenite, and ulvöspinel, as well as some sulfide minerals may also be present.

== Geology ==
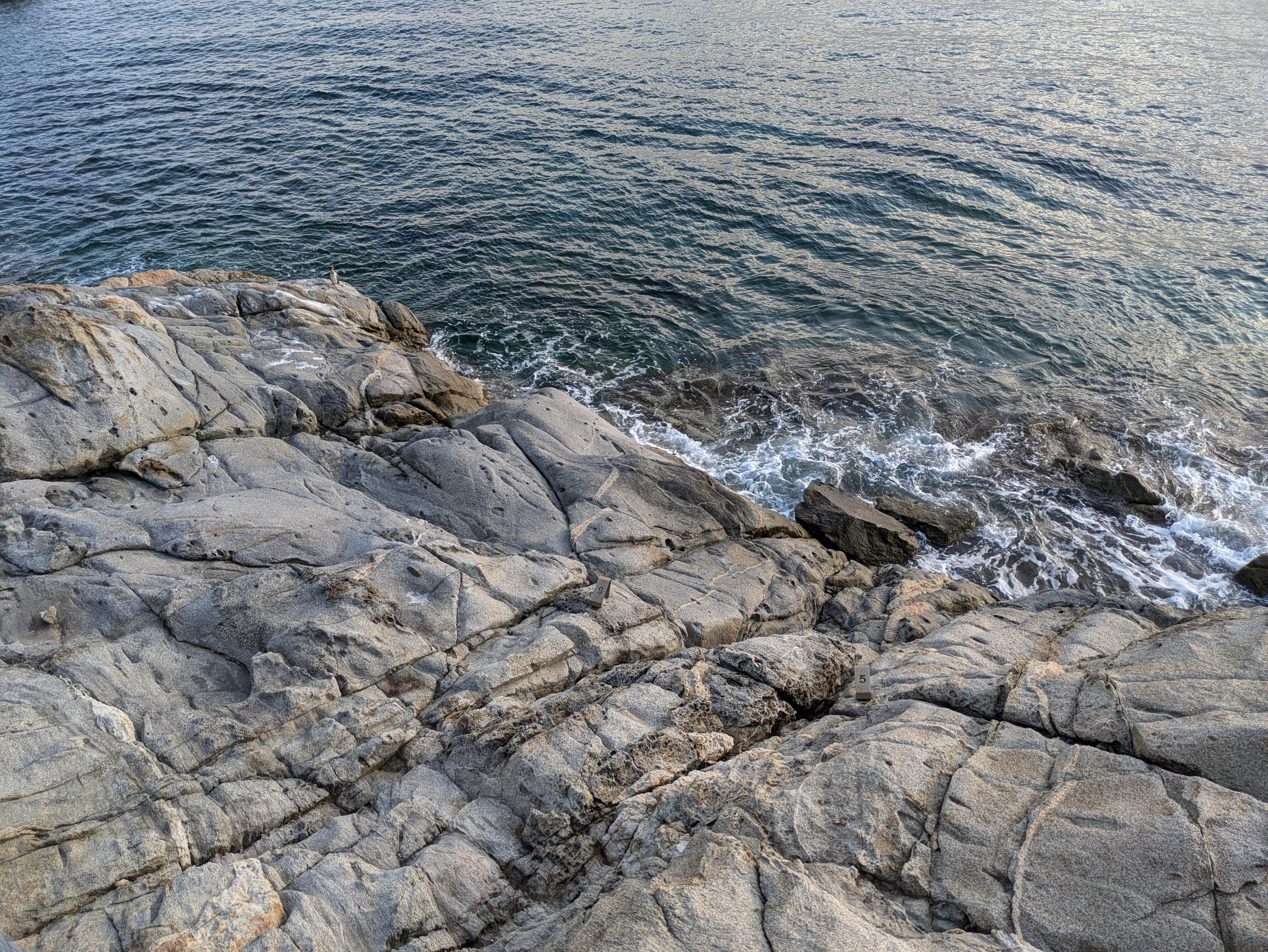
Granodiorite near the Roses Lighthouse, Catalonia, Spain.

On average, the upper continental crust has the same composition as granodiorite.

Granodiorite is a plutonic igneous rock, formed by intrusion of silica-rich magma, which cools in batholiths or stocks below the Earth's surface. It is usually only exposed at the surface after uplift and erosion have occurred.

== Etymology ==
The name comes from two related rocks to which granodiorite is an intermediate: granite and diorite. The gran- root comes from the Latin grānum for "grain", an English language derivative. The suffix -diorite, from the French language, derives from Ancient Greek, describing the distinct contrasting colors of the grains.

== Banatite ==
Banatite is a term used informally for various rocks ranging from granite to diorite, but often granodiorite, that were intruded in the Late Cretaceous in the Banat and nearby regions of present-day Hungary and Serbia. The term is also used in Australia in connection with Gulaga / Mount Dromedary in New South Wales, where it is described as "a rock of intermediate composition between quartz diorite and quartz monzonite".

== Occurrence ==
=== United States ===
Plymouth Rock is a glacial erratic boulder of granodiorite. The Sierra Nevada mountains contain large sections of granodiorite.

=== Egypt ===
Granodiorite was quarried at Mons Claudianus in the Red Sea Governorate in eastern Egypt from the 1st century AD to the mid-3rd century AD. Much of the quarried stone was transported to Rome for use in major projects such as the Pantheon and Hadrian's Villa. Additionally, granodiorite was used for the Rosetta Stone.

The extent of Egyptian granodiorite masonry is unclear. Egypt's 6000-year history makes determining the period of usage difficult as well. Perhaps like porphyry, it was ignored by the successive dynasties of Egypt and only heavily mined during Ptolemaic or Roman times. This is evidenced by the fact that most examples of granodiorite sculpture seem to have come from later dates. However, its presence in the Rosetta Stone implies that they had considerable experience with it and the fact that only newer artifacts are found may simply be because earlier pieces were lost.

=== Ireland ===
Granodiorite is quarried in the Newry area of County Armagh with the common name of 'Newry granite'.

== Uses ==
Granodiorite is most often used as crushed stone for road building. It is also used as construction material, building facade, and paving, and as an ornamental stone. The Rosetta Stone is a stele made from granodiorite. The portico columns of the Pantheon in Rome are formed from single shafts of granodiorite, each 12 metres tall by 1.5 metres in diameter.

== See also ==
- List of rock types
