= Foidolite =

Igneous rock rich in feldspathoid minerals

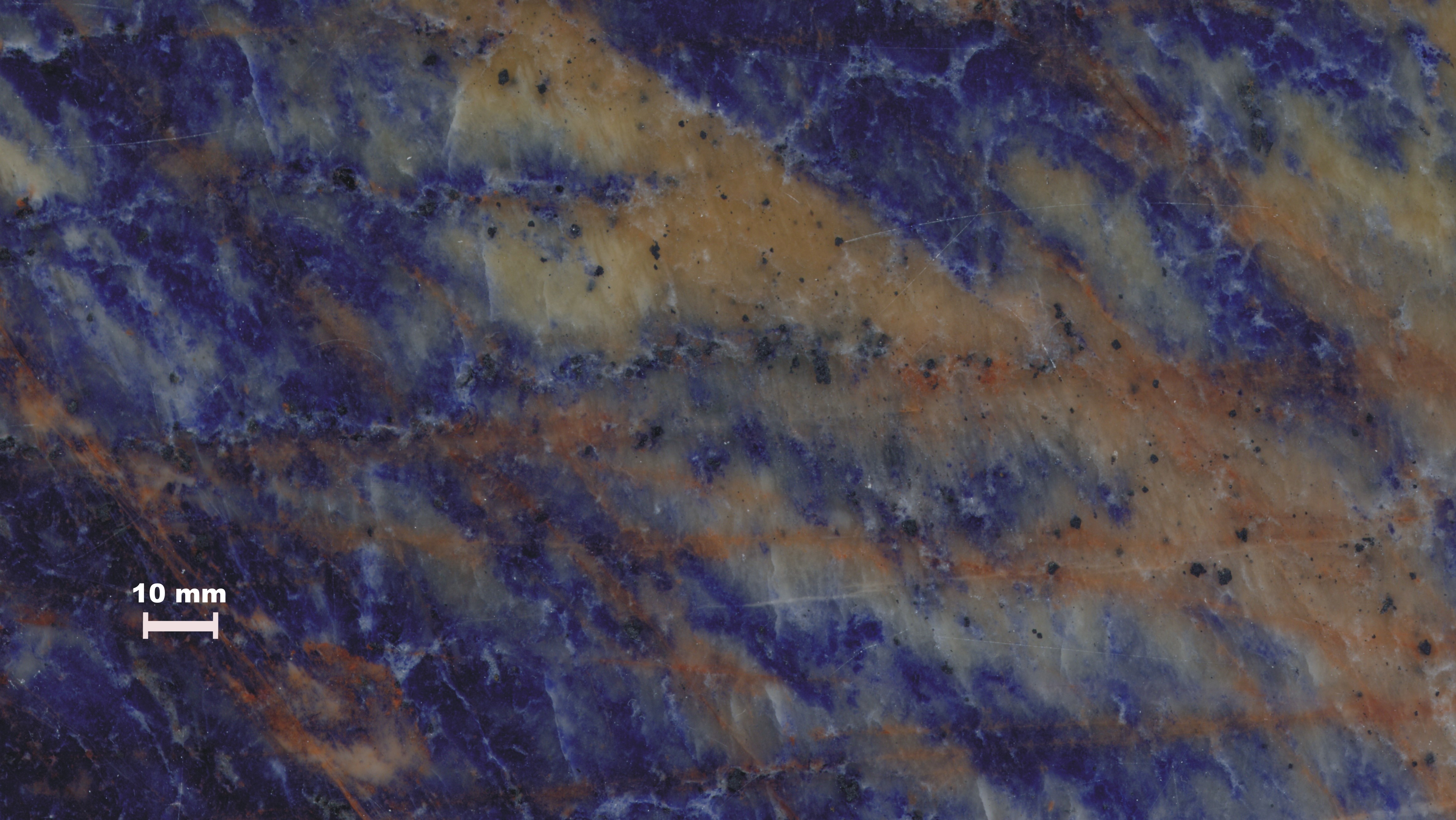
Foidolite (sodalitolite variety) from Namibia

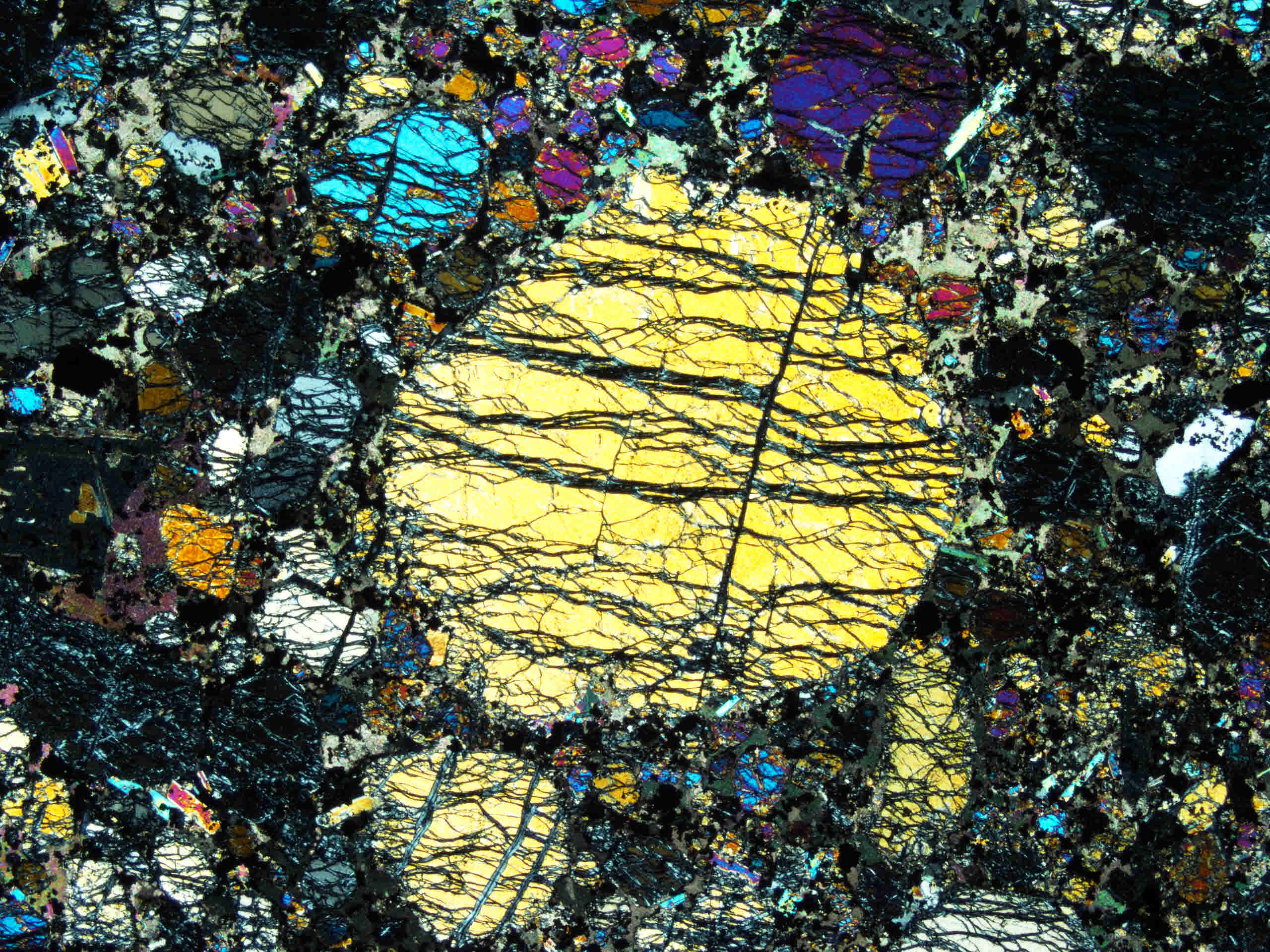
Thin section of foidolite under polarizing microscope. In the foreground there is a large yellow sodium pyroxene grain surrounded by fine grains.

Foidolite (/ˈfɔɪdəlaɪt/) is a rare phaneritic (coarse-grained) intrusive igneous rock in which more than 60% (by volume) of light-coloured minerals are feldspathoids. Crystals of alkali feldspar, plagioclase, biotite, amphibole, pyroxene, and/or olivine may be present within the rock. The volcanic equivalents are termed foidite and phonolitic or tephritic foidites.

Some foidolites are a potential source of aluminium.

== See also ==
- QAPF diagram
