= Equigranular =

Type of material composed of similarly sized crystals

An equigranular material is composed chiefly of crystals of similar orders of magnitude to one another. Basalt and gabbro commonly exhibit an equigranular texture.
