= Vesicular texture =

Texture of small enclosed cavities found in some volcanic rocks

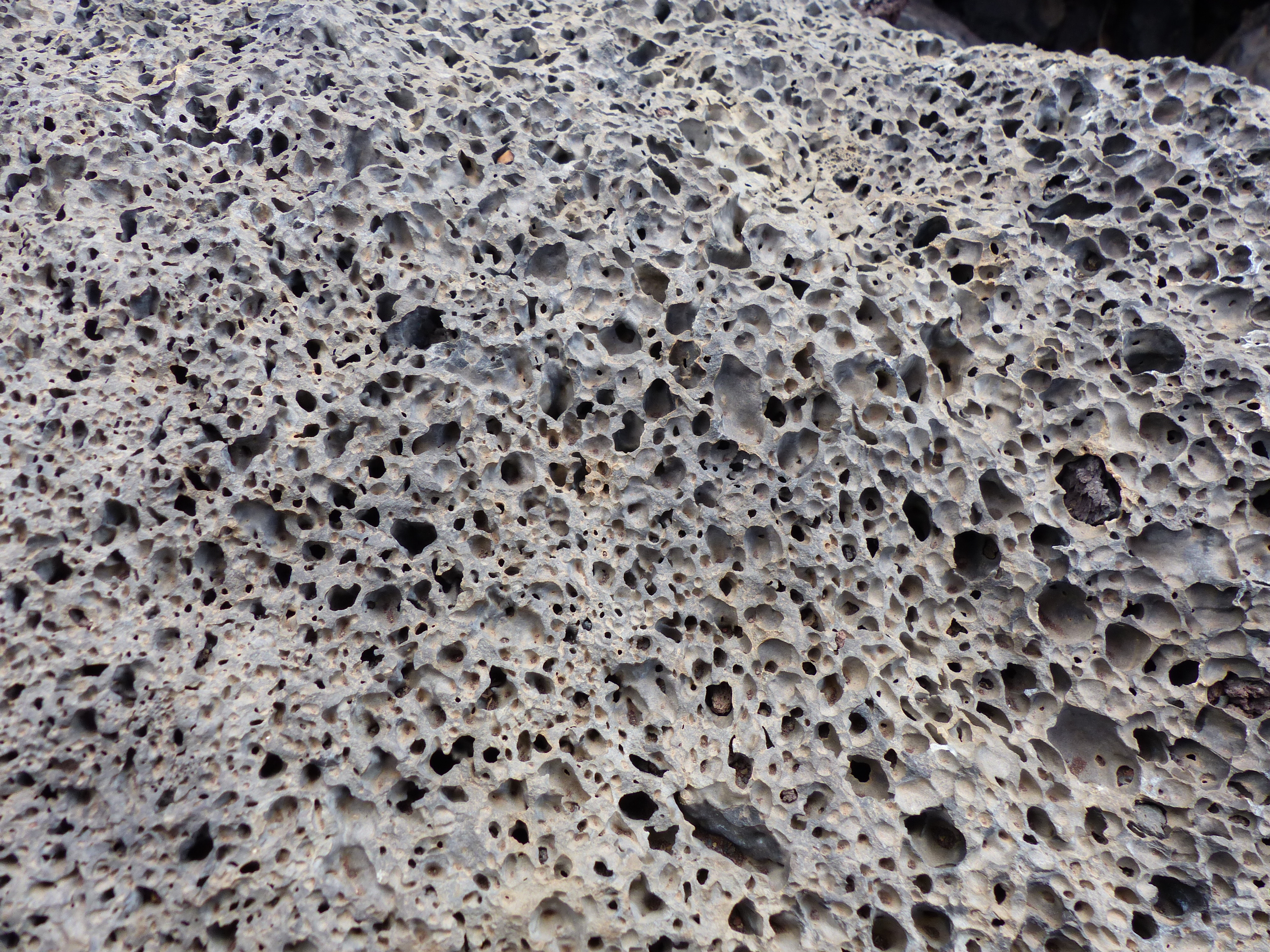
Vesicular texture in volcanic rock from Tenerife

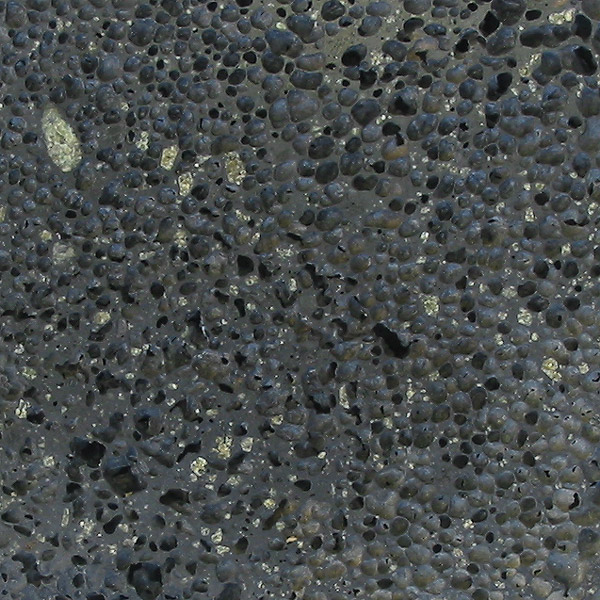
Vesicular olivine basalt from La Palma

Vesicular texture is a volcanic rock texture characterized by a rock being pitted with many cavities (known as vesicles) at its surface and inside. This texture is common in aphanitic, or glassy, igneous rocks that have come to the surface of the Earth, a process known as extrusion. As magma rises to the surface the pressure on it decreases. When this happens gasses dissolved in the magma are able to come out of solution, forming gas bubbles (the cavities) inside it. When the magma finally reaches the surface as lava and cools, the rock solidifies around the gas bubbles and traps them inside, preserving them as holes filled with gas called vesicles.

A related texture is amygdaloidal in which the volcanic rock, usually basalt or andesite, has cavities, or vesicles, that are filled with secondary minerals, such as zeolites, calcite, quartz, or chalcedony. Individual cavity fillings are termed amygdules (American usage) or amygdales (British usage). Sometimes these can be sources of semi-precious or precious stones such as diamonds.

Rock types that display a vesicular texture include pumice and scoria.

== See also ==
- Glossary of geology
