= Texture (geology) =

Relationship between materials which compose a rock

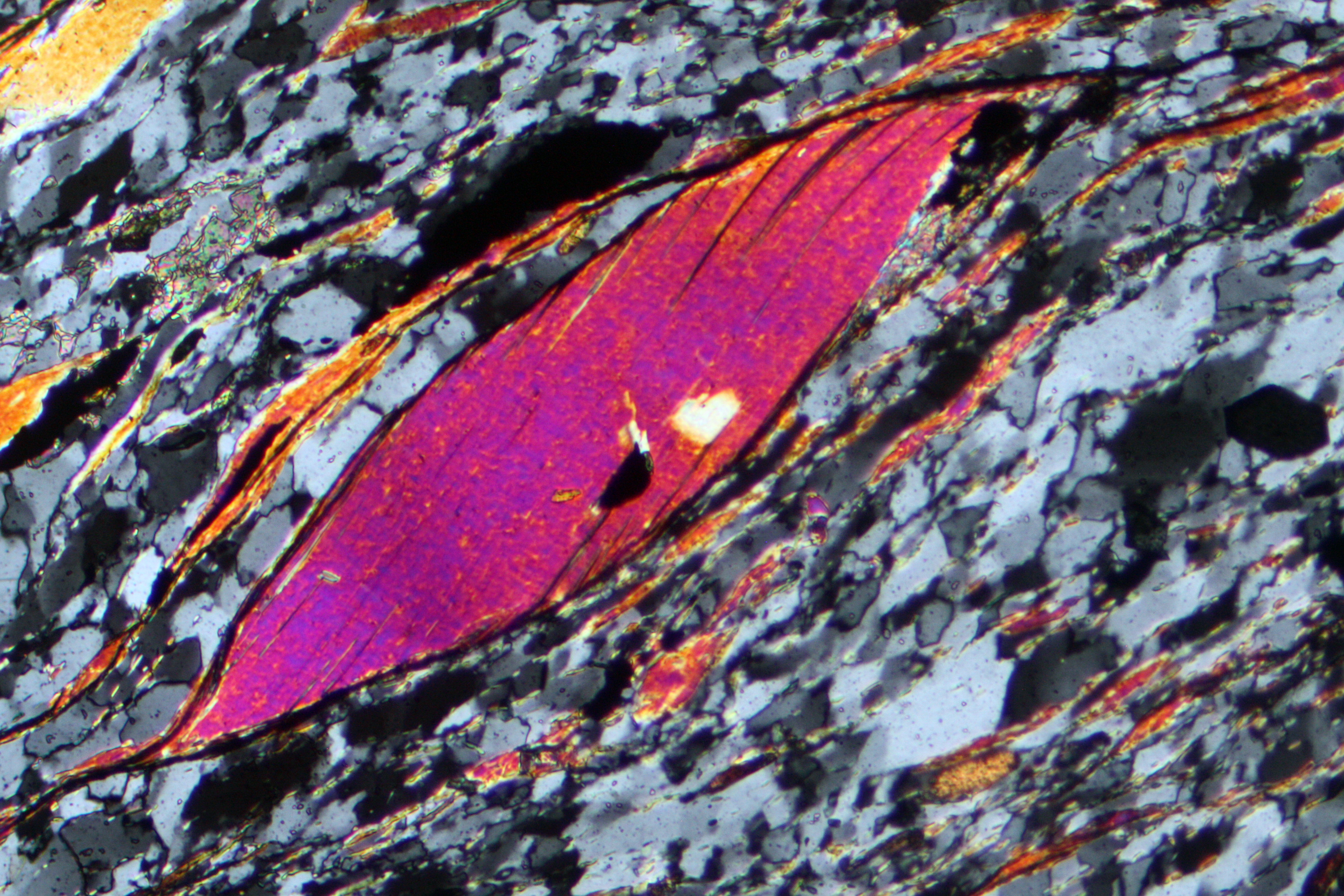
Texture in a thin section of mylonitic quartzite from the Alps, Italy

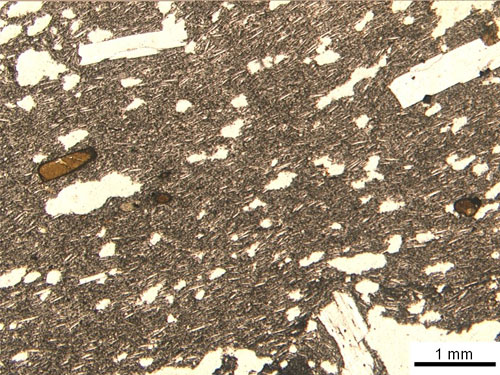
Texture in a thin section of tholeiitic basalt

In geology, texture or rock microstructure refers to the relationship between the materials of which a rock is composed. The broadest textural classes are crystalline (in which the components are intergrown and interlocking crystals), fragmental (in which there is an accumulation of fragments by some physical process), aphanitic (in which crystals are not visible to the unaided eye), and glassy (in which the particles are too small to be seen and amorphously arranged). The geometric aspects and relations amongst the component particles or crystals are referred to as the crystallographic texture or preferred orientation. Textures can be quantified in many ways. A common parameter is the crystal size distribution. This creates the physical appearance or character of a rock, such as grain size, shape, arrangement, and other properties, at both the visible and microscopic scale.

Textures are penetrative fabrics of rocks; they occur throughout the entirety of the rock mass on microscopic, hand-sized specimen, and often outcrop scales. This is similar in many ways to foliations, except a texture does not necessarily carry structural information in terms of deformation events and orientation information. Structures occur on a hand-sized specimen scale and above.

Microstructure analysis describes the textural features of the rock, and can provide information on the conditions of formation, petrogenesis, and subsequent deformation, folding, or alteration events.

Crystalline textures include phaneritic, foliated, and porphyritic. Phaneritic textures are where interlocking crystals of igneous rock are visible to the unaided eye. Foliated texture is where metamorphic rock is made of layers of materials. Porphyritic texture is one in which larger pieces (phenocrysts) are embedded in a background mass made of much finer grains.

Fragmental textures include clastic, bioclastic, and pyroclastic.

A preferred mineral orientation, is the texture of metamorphic rock in which its grains have a flattened shape (inequant), and their planes tend to be oriented in the same direction.

== Nomenclature ==
Rock microstructure includes the texture and small-scale structures of a rock. The words texture and microstructure are interchangeable, with the latter preferred in modern geological literature. However, texture is still acceptable because it is a useful means of identifying the origin of rocks, how they formed, and their appearance.

== Sedimentary microstructures ==
Description of sedimentary rock microstructure aims to provide information on the conditions of deposition of the sediment, the paleoenvironment, and the provenance of the sedimentary material.

Methods involve description of clast size, sorting, composition, rounding or angularity, sphericity and description of the matrix. Sedimentary microstructures, specifically, may include microscopic analogs of larger sedimentary structural features such as cross-bedding, syn-sedimentary faults, sediment slumping, cross-stratification, etc.

=== Maturity ===
The maturity of a sediment is related not only to the sorting (mean grain size and deviations), but also to the fragment sphericity, rounding and composition. Quartz-only sands are more mature than arkose or greywacke.

=== Fragment shape ===
Fragment shape gives information on the length of sediment transport. The more rounded the clasts, the more water or wind-worn they are. Particle shape includes form and rounding. Form indicates whether a grain is more equant (round, spherical) or platy (flat, disc-like, oblate); as well as sphericity.

==== Roundness ====
Roundness refers to the degree of sharpness of the corners and edges of a grain. The surface texture of grains may be polished, frosted, or marked by small pits and scratches. This information can usually be seen best under a binocular microscope, not in a thin section.

=== Composition ===
Composition of the clasts can give clues as to the derivation of a rock's sediments. For instance, volcanic fragments, fragments of cherts, well-rounded sands all imply different sources.

=== Matrix and cement ===
The matrix of a sedimentary rock and the mineral cement (if any) holding it together are all diagnostic.

=== Diagenetic features ===
Usually diagenesis results in a weak bedding-plane foliation. Other effects can include flattening of grains, pressure dissolution and sub-grain deformation. Mineralogical changes may include zeolite or other authigenic minerals forming in low-grade metamorphic conditions.

==== Sorting ====
Sorting is used to describe the uniformity of grain sizes within a sedimentary rock. Understanding sorting is critical to making inferences on the degree of maturity and length of transport of a sediment. Sediments become sorted on the basis of density, because of the energy of the transporting medium. High energy currents can carry larger fragments. As the energy decreases, heavier particles are deposited and lighter fragments continue to be transported. This results in sorting due to density. Sorting can be expressed mathematically by the standard deviation of the grain-size frequency curve of a sediment sample, expressed as values of φ (phi). Values range from <0.35φ (very well sorted) to >4.00φ (extremely poorly sorted).

== Metamorphic microstructure ==
The study of metamorphic rock microstructures aims to determine the timing, sequence and conditions of deformations, mineral growth and overprinting of subsequent deformation events.

Metamorphic microstructures include textures formed by the development of foliation and overprinting of foliations causing crenulations. The relationship of porphyroblasts to the foliations and to other porphyroblasts can provide information on the order of formation of metamorphic assemblages or facies of minerals.

Shear textures are particularly suited to analysis by microstructural investigations, especially in mylonites and other highly disturbed and deformed rocks.

=== Foliations and crenulations ===
On the thin section and hand-sized specimen scale a metamorphic rock may manifest a planar penetrative fabric called a foliation or a cleavage. Several foliations may be present in a rock, giving rise to a crenulation.

Identifying a foliation and its orientation is the first step in analysis of foliated metamorphic rocks. Gaining information on when the foliation formed is essential to reconstructing a P-T-t (pressure, temperature, time) path for a rock, as the relationship of a foliation to porphyroblasts is diagnostic of when the foliation formed, and the P-T conditions which existed at that time.

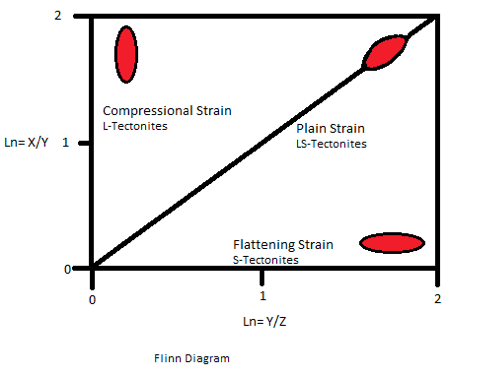
Flinn Diagram showing degree of stretching, or lineation (L) versus flattening, or foliation (S)

=== Lineations ===
Linear structures in a rock may arise from the intersection of two foliations or planar structures, such as a sedimentary bedding plane and a tectonically induced cleavage plane. The degree of lineation compared with the degree of foliation for certain strain markers in deformed rocks are commonly plotted on a Flinn diagram.

=== Ductile shear microstructures ===
Very distinctive textures form as a consequence of ductile shear. The microstructures of ductile shear zones are S-planes, C-planes and C' planes. S-planes or schistosity planes are parallel with the shear direction and are generally defined by micas or platy minerals. Define the flattened long-axis of the strain ellipse. C-planes or cissalement planes form oblique to the shear plane. The angle between the C and S planes is always acute, and defines the shear sense. Generally, the lower the C-S angle the greater the strain. The C' planes are rarely observed except in ultradeformed mylonites, and form nearly perpendicular to the S-plane.

Other microstructures which can give sense of shear include

- sigmoidal veins
- mica fish
- rotated porphyroblasts

== Igneous microstructure ==
Analysis of igneous rock microstructure may complement descriptions on the hand-sized specimen and outcrop scale. This is especially vital for describing phenocrysts and fragmental textures of tuffs, as often relationships between magma and phenocryst morphology are critical for analysing cooling, fractional crystallization and emplacement.

Analysis of intrusive rock microstructures can provide information on source and genesis, including contamination of igneous rocks by wall rocks and identifying crystals which may have been accumulated or dropped out of the melt. This is especially critical for komatiite lavas and ultramafic intrusive rocks.

=== General principles of igneous microstructure ===
Igneous microstructure is a combination of cooling rate, nucleation rate, eruption (if a lava), magma composition and its relationships to what minerals will nucleate, as well as physical effects of wall rocks, contamination and especially vapor.

=== Grain texture ===
According to the texture of the grains, igneous rocks may be classified as

- pegmatitic: very large crystals
- phaneritic: rocks contain minerals with crystals visible to the unaided eye, commonly intrusive
- aphanitic: rapid cooling, crystal nucleation and growth is stunted, forming a uniform, fine grained rock
- porphyritic: containing phenocrysts in a fine groundmass
- vesicular: contains voids caused by trapped gas while cooling
- vitreous: glassy or hyaline without crystals
- pyroclastic: rock formed of fragments of crystals, phenocrysts and rock fragments of a volcanic origin
- equigranular: rock crystals are all the same size

=== Crystal shapes ===
Crystal shape is also an important factor in the texture of an igneous rock. Crystals may be euhedral, subeuhedral or anhedral:

- Euhedral or automorphic, if the crystallographic shape is preserved.
- Subeuhedral or Subhedral, if only part is preserved.
- Anhedral or xenomorphic, if the crystals present no recognizable crystallographic forms.

Rocks composed entirely of euhedral crystals are termed panidiomorphic, and rocks composed entirely of subhedral crystals are termed subidiomorphic.

=== Porphyritic structure ===
Porphyritic structure is caused by the nucleation of crystal sites and the growth of crystals in a liquid magma. Often a magma can only grow one mineral at a time especially if it is cooling slowly. This is why most igneous rocks have only one type of phenocryst mineral. Rhythmic cumulate layers in ultramafic intrusions are a result of uninterrupted slow cooling.

When a rock cools too quickly the liquid freezes into a solid glass, or crystalline groundmass. Often vapor loss from a magma chamber will cause a porphyritic texture.

Embayments or 'corroded' margins to phenocrysts infer that they were being resorbed by the magma and may imply addition of fresh, hotter magma. Ostwald ripening is also used to explain some porphyritic igneous textures, especially orthoclase megacrystic granites.

=== Phenocryst shape: implications ===
A crystal growing in a magma adopts a habit (see crystallography) which best reflects its environment and cooling rate. The usual phenocryst habit is the ones commonly observed. This may imply a 'normal' cooling rate.

Abnormal cooling rates occur in supercooled magmas, particularly komatiite lavas. Here, low nucleation rates due to superfluidity prevent nucleation until the liquid is well below the mineral growth curve. Growth then occurs at extreme rates, favoring slender, long crystals. Additionally, at crystal vertices and terminations, spikes and skeletal shapes may form because growth is favoured at crystal edges. Spinifex or dendritic texture is an example of this result. Hence, the shape of phenocrysts can provide valuable information on cooling rate and initial magma temperature.

=== Spherulites ===
Spherulitic texture is the result of cooling and nucleation of material in a lava which has achieved supersaturation in the crystal component. Thus it is often a subsolidus process in supercooler felsic rocks. Often, two minerals will grow together in the spherulite. Axiolitic texture results from spherulitic growth along fractures in volcanic glass, often from invasion of water.

=== Graphic and other intergrowth textures ===
Intergrowths of two or more minerals can form in a variety of ways, and interpretations of the intergrowths can be critical in understanding both magmatic and cooling histories of igneous rocks. A few of the many important textures are presented here as examples.

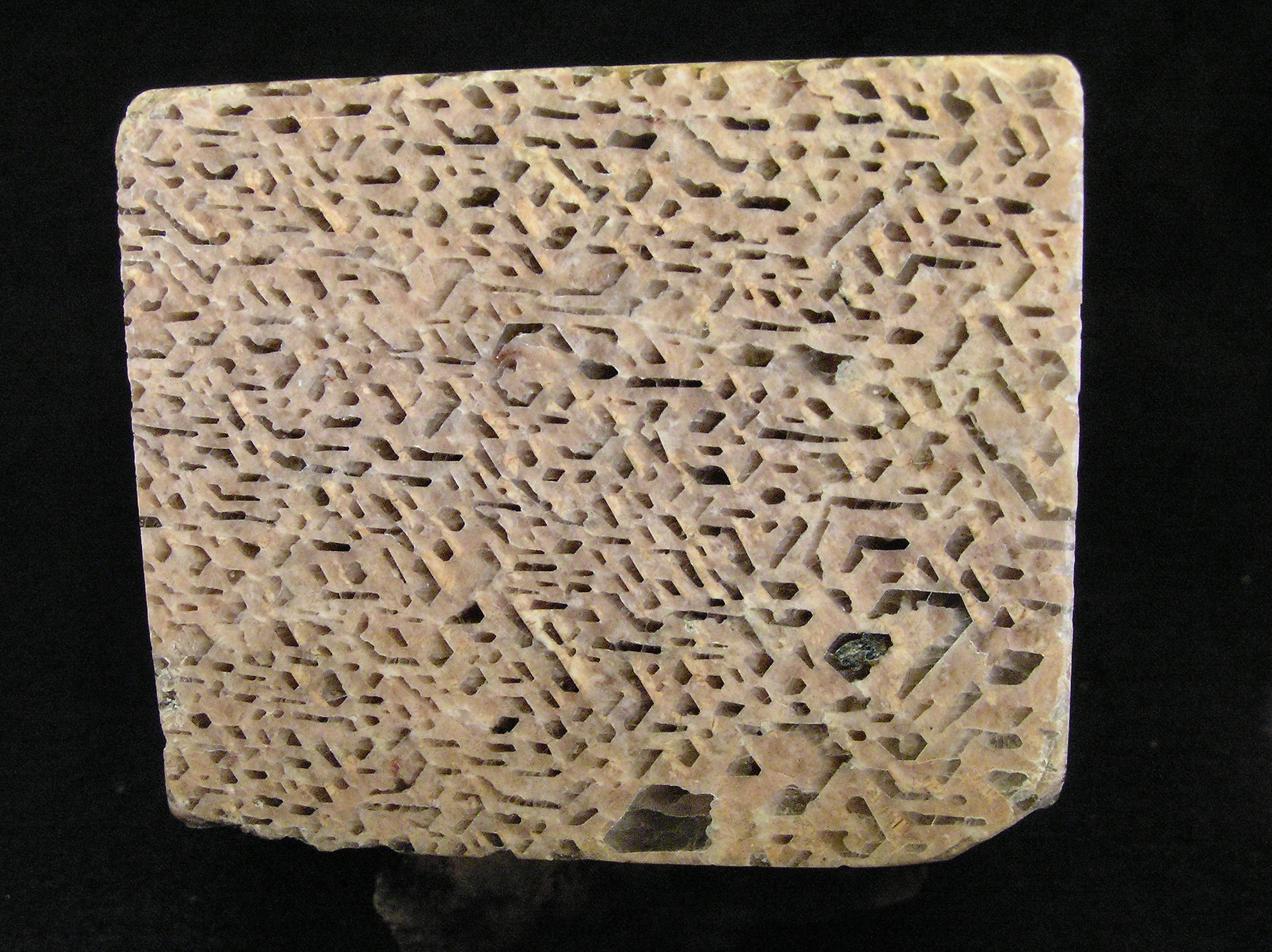
Graphic granite from Norway

Graphic, micrographic, and granophyric textures are examples of intergrowths formed during magmatic crystallization. They are angular intergrowths of quartz and alkali feldspar. When well-developed, the intergrowths may resemble ancient cuneiform writing, hence the name. These intergrowths are typical of pegmatite and granophyre, and they have been interpreted as documenting simultaneous crystallization of the intergrown minerals in the presence of a silicate melt together with a water-rich phase.

Intergrowths that form by exsolution are aids in interpreting cooling histories of rocks. Perthite is an intergrowth of K-feldspar with albite feldspar, formed by exsolution from an alkali feldspar of intermediate composition: the coarseness of perthitic intergrowths is related to cooling rate. Perthite is typical of many granites. Myrmekite is a microscopic, vermicular (worm-like) intergrowth of quartz and sodium-rich plagioclase common in granite; myrmekite may form as alkali feldspar breaks down by exsolution and silicon is transported by fluids in cooling rocks.

Iron-titanium oxides are extremely important, as they carry the predominant magnetic signatures of many rocks, and so they have played a major role in our understanding of plate tectonics. These oxides commonly have complex textures related both to exsolution and oxidation. For instance, ulvospinel in igneous rocks such as basalt and gabbro commonly oxidizes during subsolidus cooling to produce regular intergrowths of magnetite and ilmenite. The process can determine what magnetic record is inherited by the rock.

== See also ==
- List of rock textures – List of rock textural and morphological terms
- List of rock types
- Metamorphism – Change of minerals in pre-existing rocks without melting into liquid magma
- Structural geology – Science of the description and interpretation of deformation in the Earth's crust
- Sedimentology – Study of natural sediments and their formation processes
- Petrology – Study of rocks in geology
- Boudinage – Structures in rock caused by extension
- Texture (crystalline) – Distribution of crystallographic orientations in a polycrystalline material
- Igneous textures – Property of igneous rocks
- Vesicular texture – Texture of small enclosed cavities found in some volcanic rocks
- Soil texture – Property of a soil
