= Extrusive rock =

Mode of igneous volcanic rock formation

IUGS classification of aphanitic extrusive igneous rocks to their relative alkali (Na_{2}O + K_{2}O) and silica (SiO_{2}) weight contents. Blue area is roughly where alkaline rocks plot; yellow area where subalkaline rocks plot. Original source: *Le Maitre, R.W. (ed.); 1989: A classification of igneous rocks and glossary of terms, Blackwell Science, Oxford.

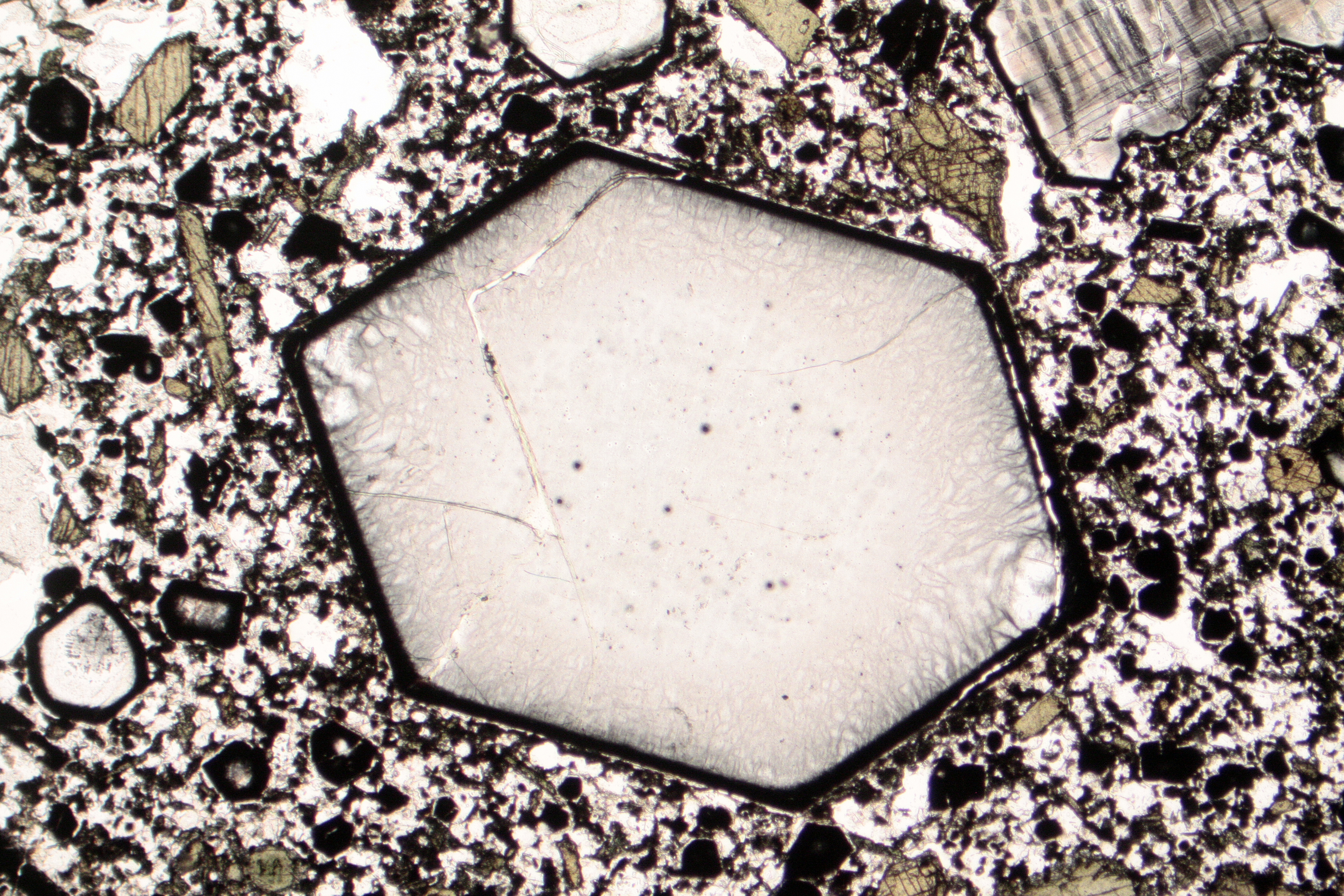
A volcanic rock from Italy with a relatively large six-sided phenocryst (diameter about 1 mm) surrounded by a fine-grained groundmass, as seen in thin section under a petrographic microscope

Extrusive rock refers to the mode of igneous volcanic rock formation in which hot magma from inside the Earth flows out (extrudes) onto the surface as lava or explodes violently into the atmosphere to fall back as pyroclastics or tuff. In contrast, intrusive rock refers to rocks formed by magma which cools below the surface.

The main effect of extrusion is that the magma can cool much more quickly in the open air or under seawater, and there is little time for the growth of crystals. Sometimes, a residual portion of the matrix fails to crystallize at all, instead becoming a natural glass like obsidian.

If the magma contains abundant volatile components which are released as free gas, then it may cool with large or small vesicles (bubble-shaped cavities) such as in pumice, scoria, or vesicular basalt. Other examples of extrusive rocks are rhyolite and andesite.

== Texture ==
The texture of extrusive rocks is characterized by fine-grained crystals indistinguishable to the human eye, described as aphantic. Crystals in aphantic rocks are small in size due to their rapid formation during eruption. Any larger crystals visible to the human eye, called phenocrysts, form earlier while slowly cooling in the magma reservoir. When igneous rocks contain two distinct grain sizes, the texture is porphyritic, and the finer crystals are called the groundmass. The extrusive rocks scoria and pumice have a vesicular, bubble-like, texture due to the presence of vapor bubbles trapped in the magma.

== Extrusive bodies and rock types ==
Shield volcanoes are large, slow forming volcanoes that erupt fluid basaltic magma that cools to form the extrusive rock basalt. Basalt is composed of minerals readily available in the planet's crust, including feldspars and pyroxenes.

Fissure volcanoes pour out low viscosity basaltic magma from fissure vents to form the extrusive rock basalt.

Composite or stratovolcanoes often have andesitic magma and typically form the extrusive rock andesite. Andesitic magma is composed of many gases and melted mantle rocks.

Cinder or scoria cones violently expel lava with high gas content, and due to the vapor bubbles in this mafic lava, the extrusive basalt scoria is formed.

Lava domes are formed by high viscosity lava that piles up, forming a dome shape. Domes typically solidify to form the rich in silica extrusive rock obsidian and sometimes dacite domes form the extrusive rock dacite, like in the case of Mount St. Helens.

Calderas are volcanic depressions formed after an erupted volcano collapses. Resurgent calderas can refill with an eruption of rhyolitic magma to form the extrusive rock rhyolite like the Yellowstone Caldera.

Submarine volcanoes erupt on the ocean floor and produce the extrusive rock pumice. Pumice is a light-weight glass with a vesicular texture that differs from scoria in its silicic composition and therefore floats.

== See also ==
- Intrusive suite
- Seamount
