= QAPF diagram =

Classification system for igneous rocks

QAPF diagram for classification of plutonic rocks

A QAPF diagram is a doubled-triangle plot diagram used to classify igneous rocks based on their mineralogy. The acronym QAPF stands for "quartz, alkali feldspar, plagioclase, feldspathoid (foid)", which are the four mineral groups used for classification in a QAPF diagram. The percentages (ratios) of the Q, A, P and F groups are normalized, i.e., recalculated so that their sum is 100%.

== Origin ==
QAPF diagrams are created by the International Union of Geological Sciences (IUGS): Subcommission on the Systematics of Igneous Rocks as fostered by Albert Streckeisen (whence their alternative name: Streckeisen diagrams). Geologists worldwide use the diagrams in classifying igneous rocks, especially plutonic rocks.

== Usage ==
QAPF diagrams are mostly used to classify plutonic rocks (phaneritic rocks), and can be used to classify volcanic rocks (aphanitic rocks) if modal mineralogical compositions have been determined (for an example, see basalt). However, QAPF diagrams are not used to classify pyroclastic rocks or volcanic rocks if modal mineralogical compositions are not determined; there the TAS classification (Total-Alkali-Silica) is used instead. The TAS classification is also used if volcanic rock contains volcanic glass (such as obsidian).

QAPF diagrams are not used if mafic minerals make up more than 90% of the rock composition (for example: peridotites and pyroxenites). Instead, an alternate triangle plot diagram is used (see Streckeisen diagram, lower right).

An exact name can be given only if the mineralogical composition is established, which cannot be determined in the field.

== Reading the QAPF diagram ==
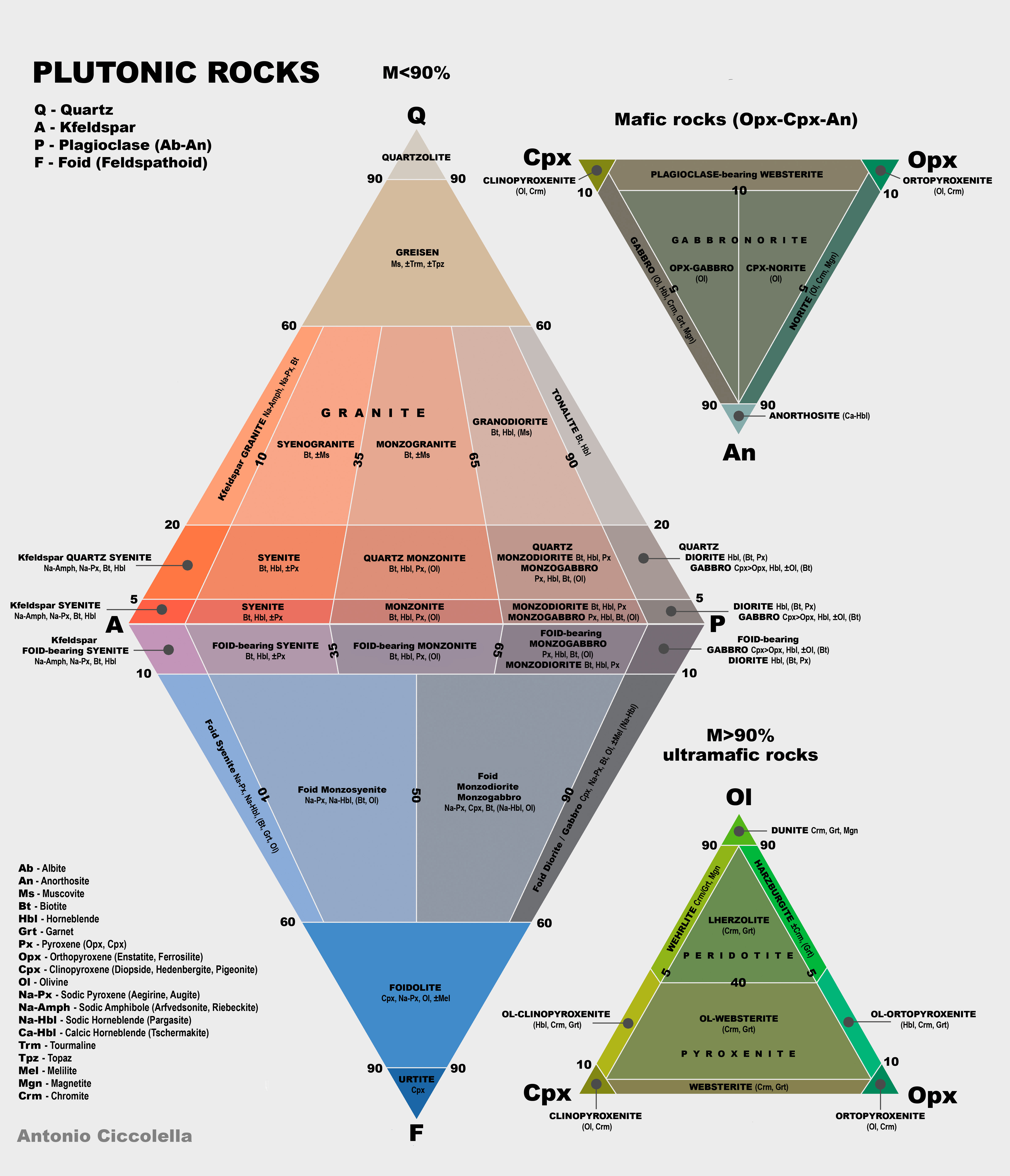
QAPF diagram for plutonic rocks, along with triangle diagrams for mafic/ultramafic plutonic rocks

The QAPF diagram presents for use the proportions (ratios) of four plutonic mineral(s) or mineral groups, which are: quartz (Q), the alkali feldspars (A), the plagioclase feldspars (P), and the feldspathoids (F).

Because F and Q groups cannot simultaneously form in plutonic rocks—due to the difference in their respective silica contents—the QAPF diagram is drawn as two mutually exclusive triangle plots, i.e., QAP and FAP. These are joined along one side such that, between them, each of the two triangle plots exclude either the Q group or F group minerals. (Other mineral groups may occur in samples, but they are disregarded in this classification method.)

To use this classification method, the concentrations (the modes) of the four mineral groups must be determined or estimated, and then normalized to 100%. Thus, for a rock identified as having, say, 20% mica, 30% quartz (Q), 30% alkali feldspar (A), and 20% plagioclase (P), the mica is disregarded, and the normalized ratios (proportions) of the Q, A, and P groups are calculated as 37.5%, 37.5% and 25% = 100%.

- i.e., (30 + 30 + 20= 80; then 30/80= 37.5%, 30/80= 37.5%, and 20/80= 25%; therefore 37.5 + 37.5 + 25= 100%).

Of these, the (again) normalised relative proportions of A and P are 37.5/62.5 = 60% and 25/62.5 = 40%. The rock can now be plotted on the diagram by finding a horizontal line representing 37.5% quartz and then plotting a point on it 60% of the way across from the A side to the P side. For this example the rock can be classified as a Monzogranite.

And, a plutonic rock that contains no feldspathoids (F group), no alkali feldspar (A group), but contains plagioclase-feldspar (P group), many pyroxenes (not labeled in a QAPF diagram), and few quartz grains (Q group)—is probably gabbro; (see right edge of the Streckeisen diagram, at side P).

This diagram makes no distinction between rock types at the same QAPF plot position and classification, but of different bulk chemical compositions with respect to other minerals such as olivine, pyroxenes, amphiboles or micas. For example, because non-Q, -A, -P and -F minerals are disregarded the system does not distinguish between gabbro, diorite, and anorthosite.

The QAPF diagram is not used for all plutonic rocks; the ultramafic plutonic rocks are the most important of groups that have separate classification diagrams; (see Streckeisen diagram).
