= Phanerite =

Igneous rock composed of crystals visible to the naked eye

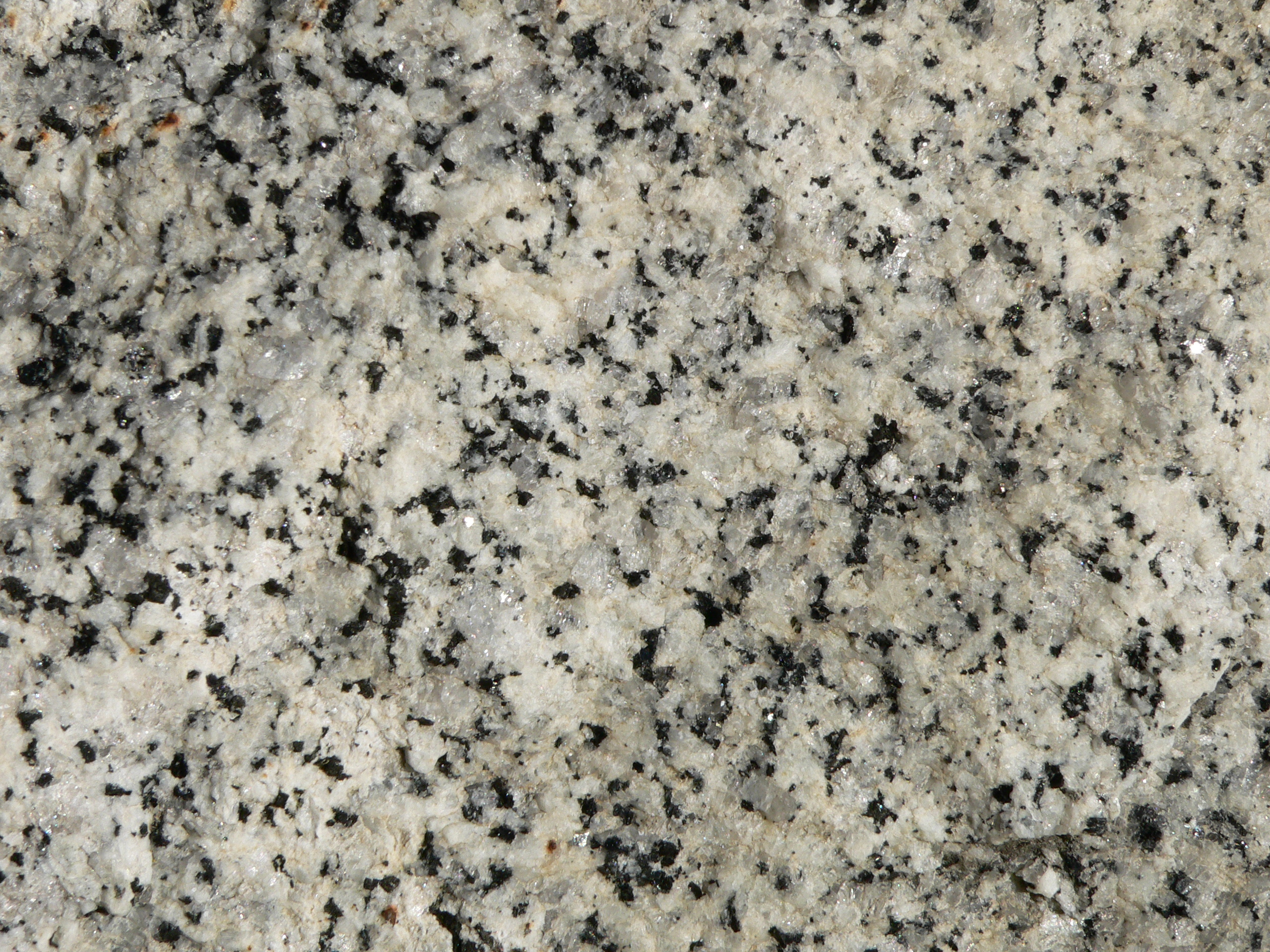
Close-up of granite, a phanerite rock, from Yosemite National Park in California, U.S.

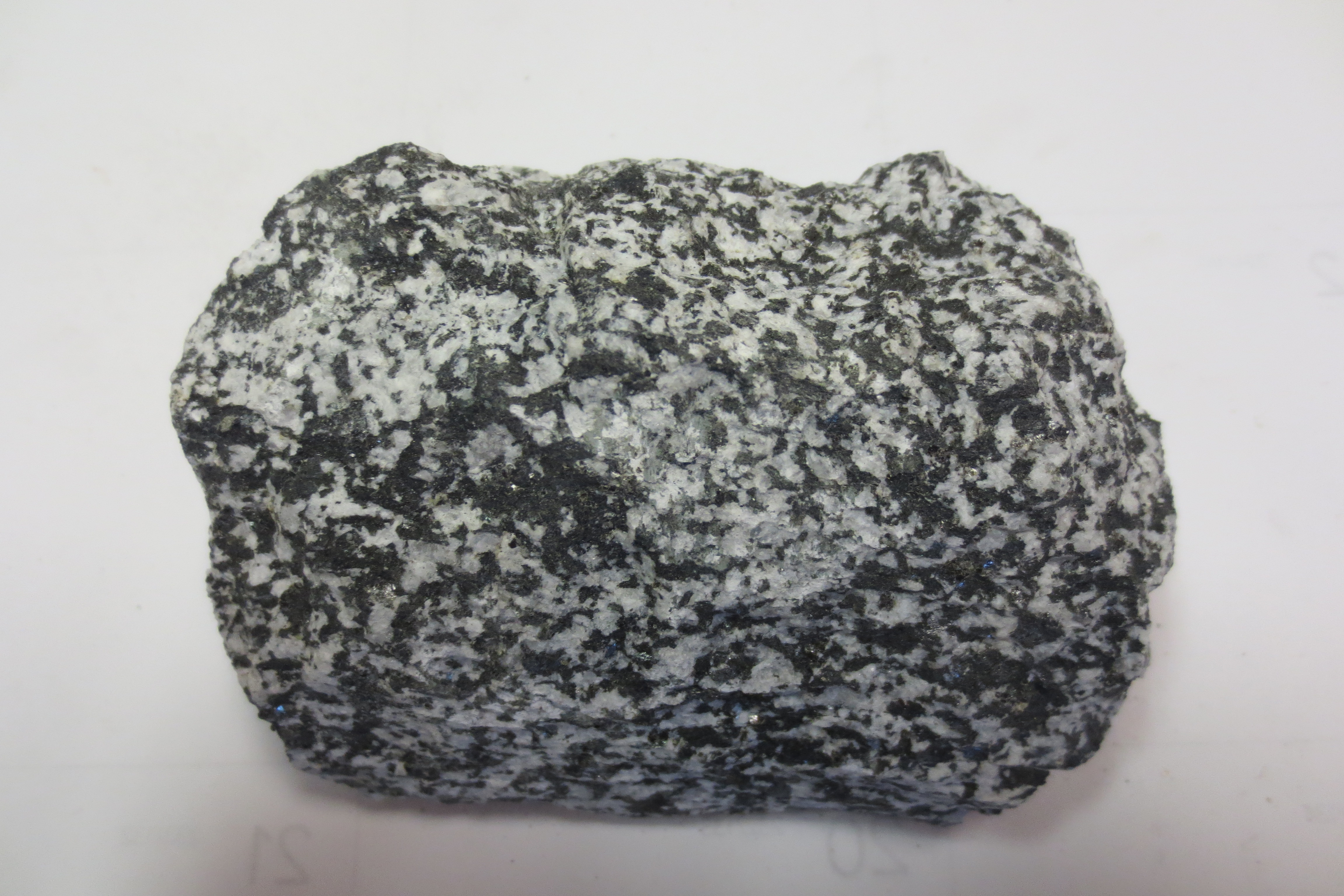
Phaneritic diorite from Massachusetts

A phanerite is an igneous rock whose microstructure is made up of crystals large enough to be distinguished with the unaided human eye. In contrast, the crystals in an aphanitic rock are too fine-grained to be identifiable. Phaneritic texture forms when magma deep underground in the plutonic environment cools slowly, giving the crystals time to grow.

Phanerites are often described as coarse-grained or macroscopically crystalline.

== Examples ==
- Peridotite
- Pyroxenite
- Foidolite
- Gabbro
- Diorite
- Monzonite
- Syenite
- Tonalite
- Granodiorite
- Granite

== See also ==
- Pegmatite
- Porphyritic
