= Porphyritic =

Igneous rock with large and small crystals

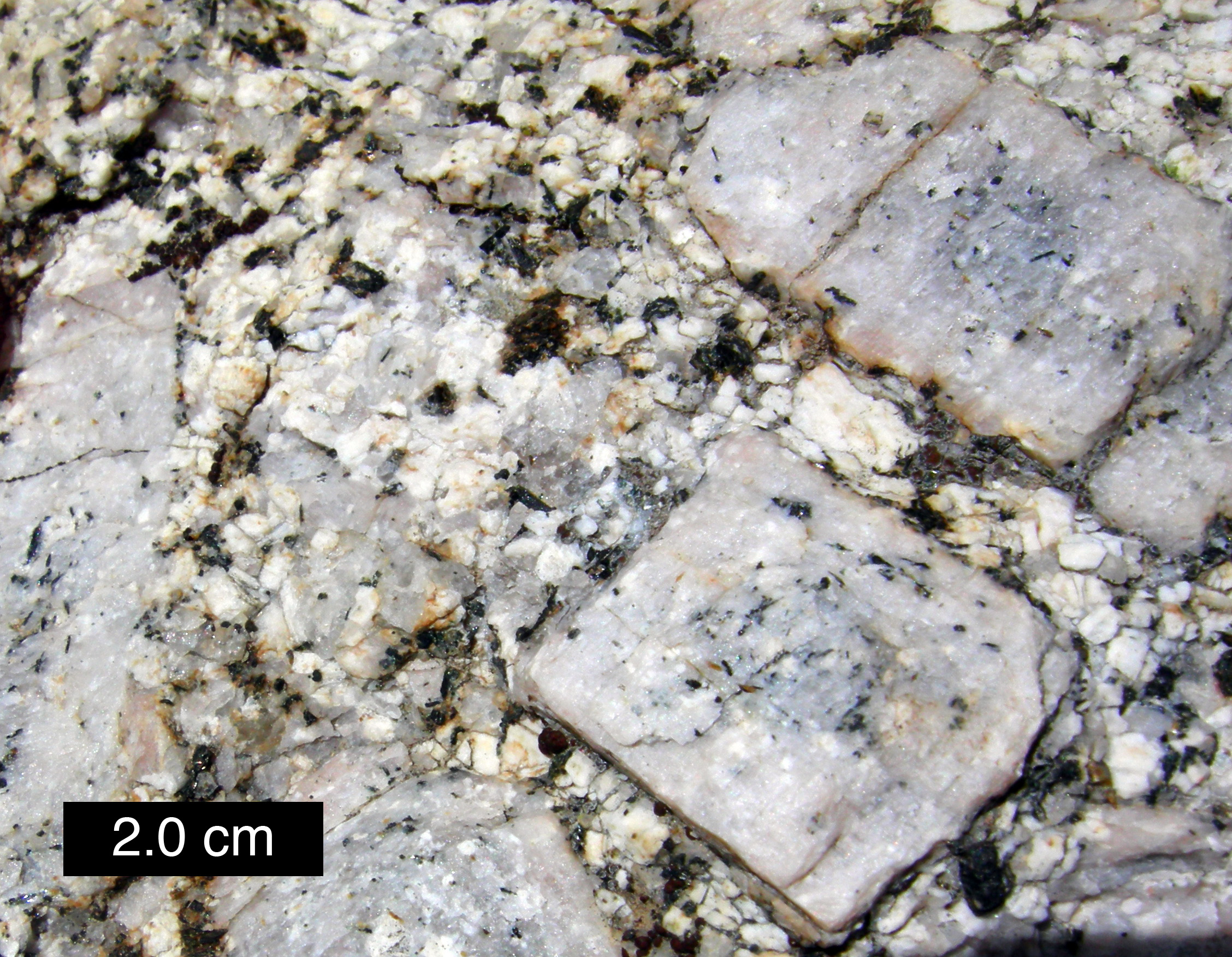
Porphyritic texture in a granite. This is an intrusive porphyritic rock. The white, square feldspar phenocrysts are much larger than crystals in the surrounding matrix; eastern Sierra Nevada, Rock Creek Canyon, California.

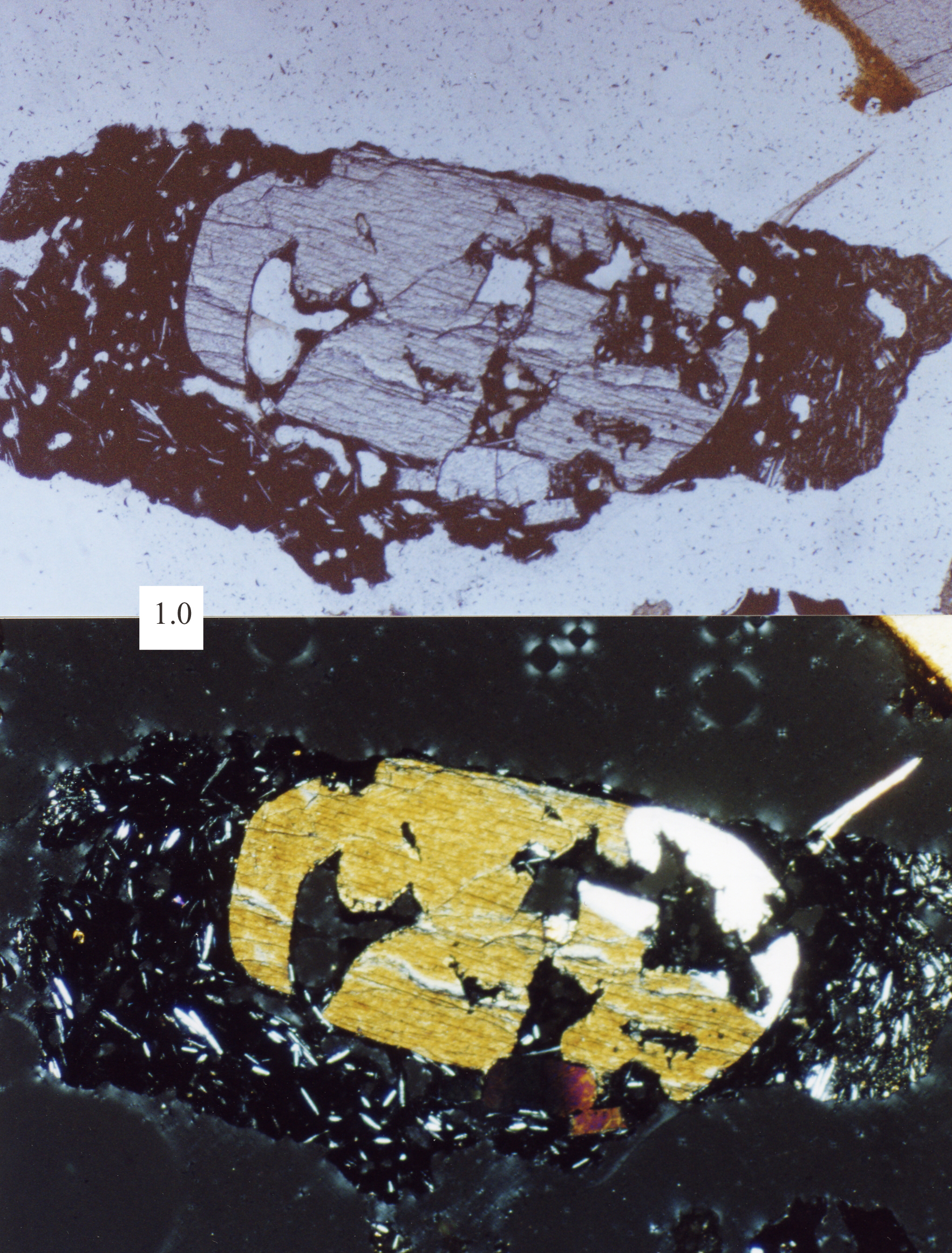
A porphyritic volcanic sand grain, as seen under the petrographic microscope. The large grain in the middle is of a much different size class than the small needle-like crystals around it. Scale box in millimeters.

Porphyritic is an adjective used in geology to describe igneous rocks with a distinct difference in the size of mineral crystals, with the larger crystals known as phenocrysts. Both extrusive and intrusive rocks can be porphyritic, meaning all types of igneous rocks can display some degree of porphyritic texture. Most porphyritic rocks have bimodal size ranges, meaning the rock is composed of two distinct sizes of crystal.

In extrusive rocks, the phenocrysts are surrounded by a fine-grained (aphanitic) matrix or groundmass of volcanic glass or non-visible crystals, commonly seen in porphyritic basalt. Porphyritic intrusive rocks have a matrix with individual crystals easily distinguished with the eye, but one group of crystals appearing clearly much bigger than the rest, as in a porphyritic granite.

The term comes from the Ancient Greek πορφύρα (porphyra), meaning "purple". Purple was the color of royalty, and the "imperial porphyry" was a deep purple igneous rock with large crystals of plagioclase, prized for monuments and building projects due to its hardness. Subsequently, the name was adapted to describe any igneous rocks with a similar texture.

== Formation ==
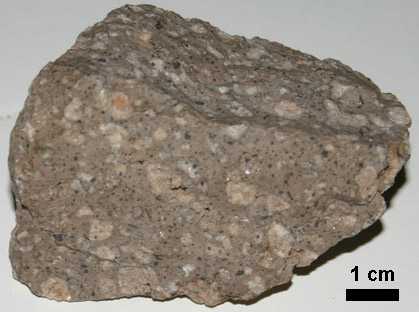
Andesite porphyry from summit of O'Leary Peak. This is an extrusive porphyritic rock, as the pink (and black) phenocrysts are clearly visible, in contrast to the grey groundmass with its microscopic crystals.

Porphyritic rocks are a product of igneous differentiation, and are generally formed when a column of rising magma is cooled in two stages: In the first stage, the magma is cooled slowly deep in the crust, creating the large crystal grains, with a diameter of 2mm or more. In the final stage, the magma is cooled rapidly at relatively shallow depth or as it erupts from a volcano, creating small grains that are usually invisible to the unaided eye, typically referred to as the matrix or groundmass.

The formation of large phenocrysts is due to fractional crystallization. As the melt cools, it begins crystallizing the highest melting point minerals closest to the overall composition first. This forms large, well-shaped euhedral phenocrysts. If these phenocrysts are different in density to the remaining melt, they usually settle out of solution, eventually creating cumulates. However, when this is interrupted by sudden eruption of the melt as lava, or when the density of the crystals and remaining melt remains similar, they become entrapped in the final rock.

This can also occur when the chemical composition of the remaining melt is close to the eutectic point as it cools, resulting in multiple different minerals solidifying at once and filling the remaining space simultaneously, limiting their size and shape.

A porphyritic, igneous rock with distinct clusters of phenocrysts, not necessarily of the same mineral, may also be referred to as glomeroporphyritic or cumulophyritic.

== See also ==
- Pegmatite
- Phanerite
