= Aphanite =

Igneous rock composed of very small crystals invisible to the naked eye

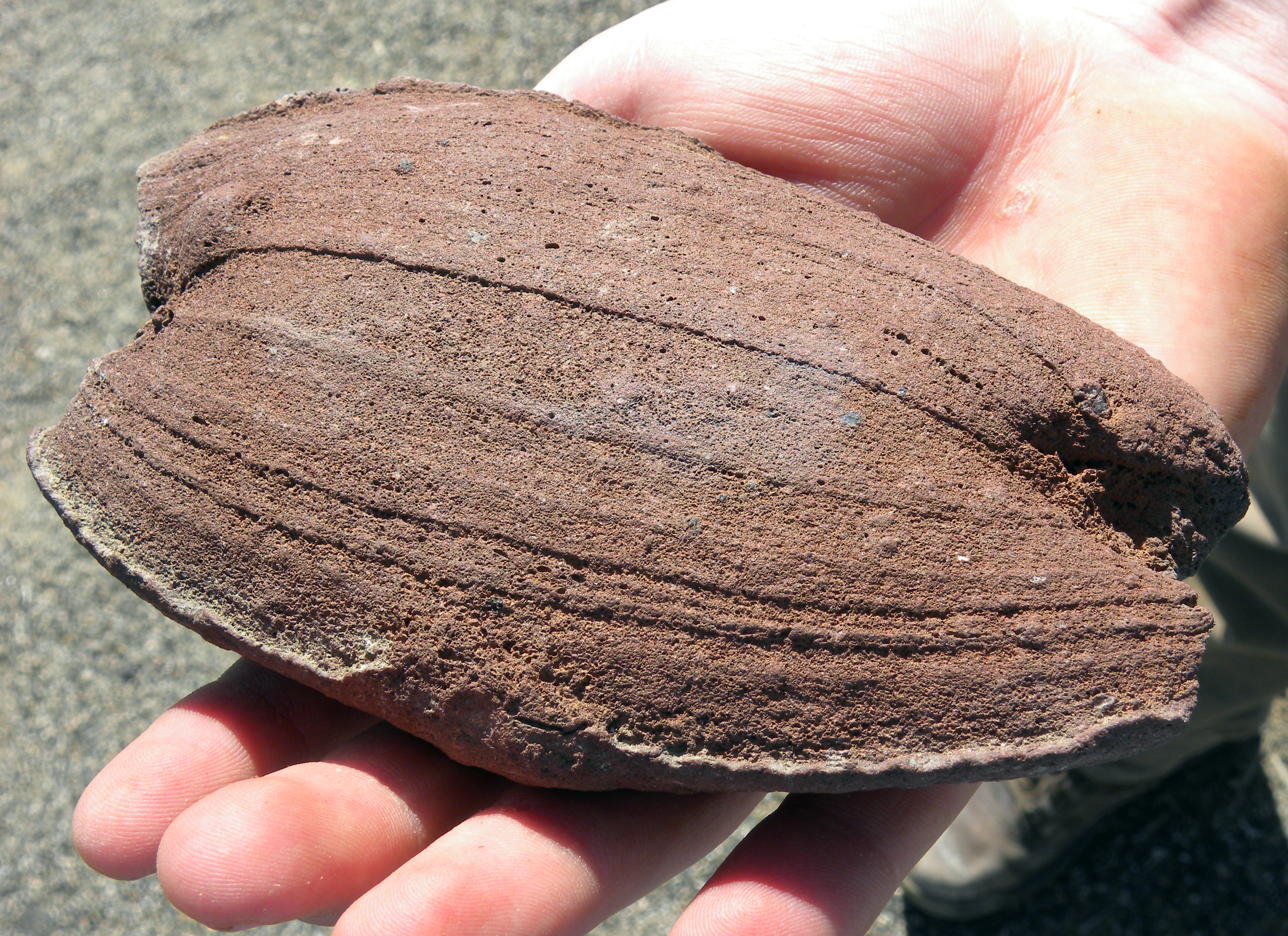
The smooth texture of this basaltic volcanic bomb is aphanitic.

IUGS classification of aphanitic extrusive igneous rocks according to their relative alkali (Na_{2}O + K_{2}O) and silica (SiO_{2}) weight contents. Blue area is roughly where alkaline rocks plot; yellow area where subalkaline rocks plot.

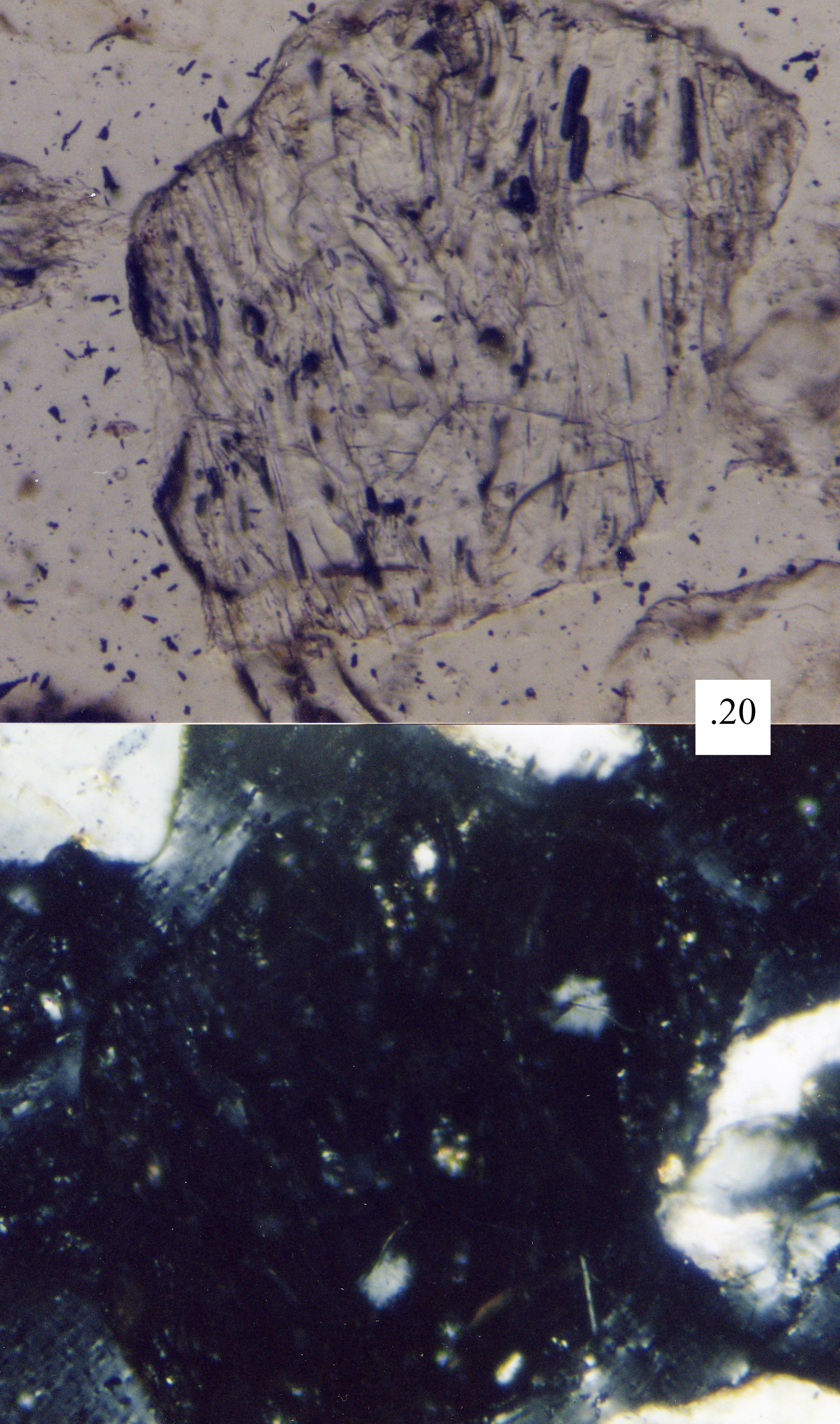
An aphanitic volcanic sand grain, with fine-grained groundmass, as seen through a petrographic microscope

Aphanites (adj. aphanitic; from Ancient Greek ἀφανής (aphanḗs) 'invisible') are igneous rocks that are so fine-grained that their component mineral crystals are not visible to the naked eye (in contrast to phanerites, in which the crystals are visible to the unaided eye). This geological texture results from rapid cooling in volcanic or hypabyssal (shallow subsurface) environments. As a rule, the texture of these rocks is not the same as that of volcanic glass (e.g., obsidian), with volcanic glass being non-crystalline (amorphous), and having a glass-like appearance.

Aphanites are commonly porphyritic, having large crystals embedded in the fine groundmass, or matrix. The larger inclusions are called phenocrysts. They consist essentially of very small crystals of minerals such as plagioclase feldspar, with hornblende or augite, and may contain also biotite, quartz, and orthoclase.

== Common rocks that can be aphanitic ==
- Andesite
- Basalt
- Basanite
- Dacite
- Komatiite
- Picrite basalt
- Phonolite
- Rhyolite
- Trachyte

== See also ==
- Pegmatite
