= Ellicott City Granodiorite =

Ordovician granitic pluton in Maryland

- Stratigraphic range: Ordovician
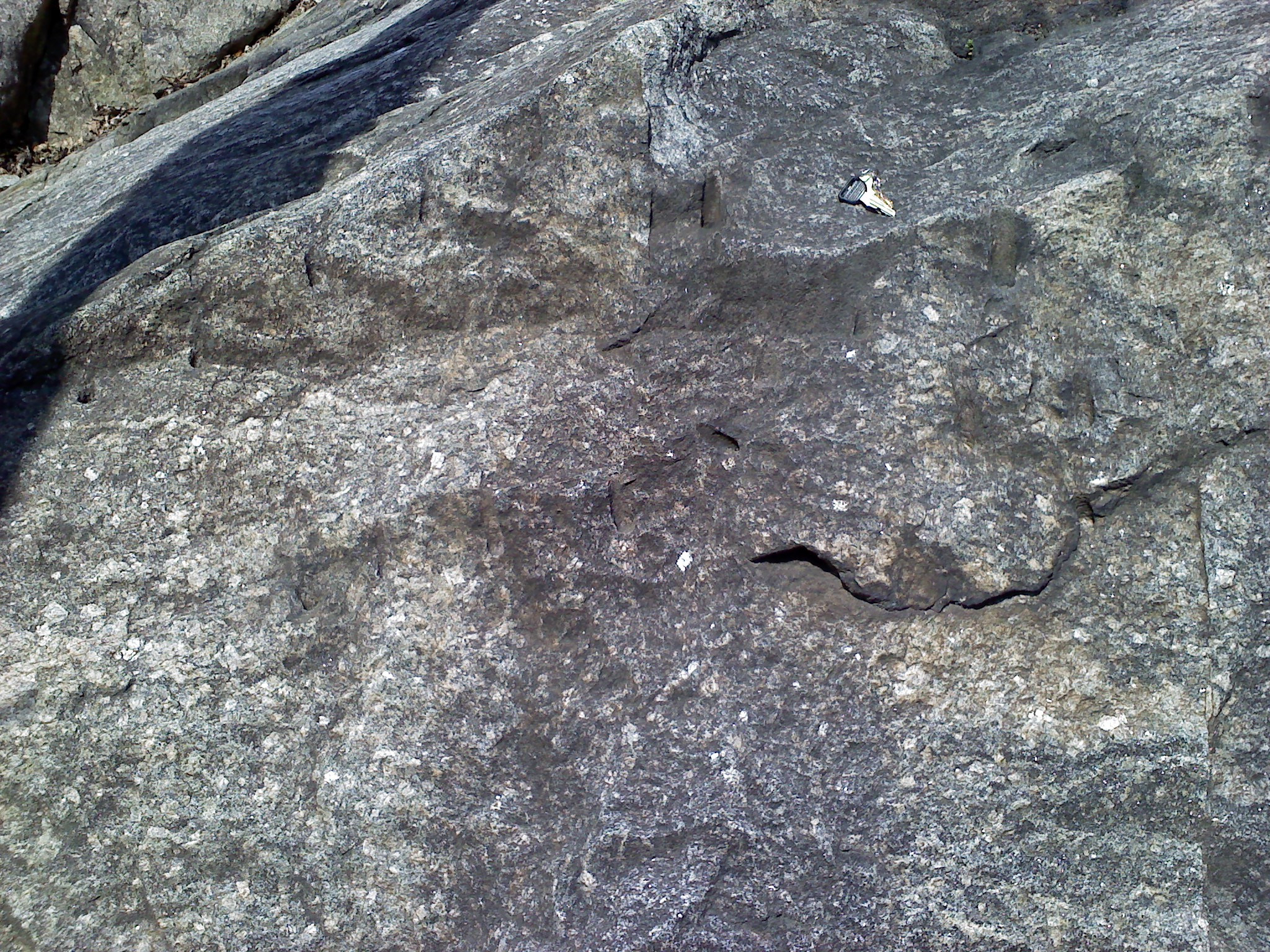
- An outcrop on Main Street, Ellicott City
- Type: igneous

Location
- Region: Piedmont of Maryland
- Extent: Howard and Baltimore Counties

Type section
- Named for: Ellicott City, Maryland
- Named by: Knopf and Jonas, 1929

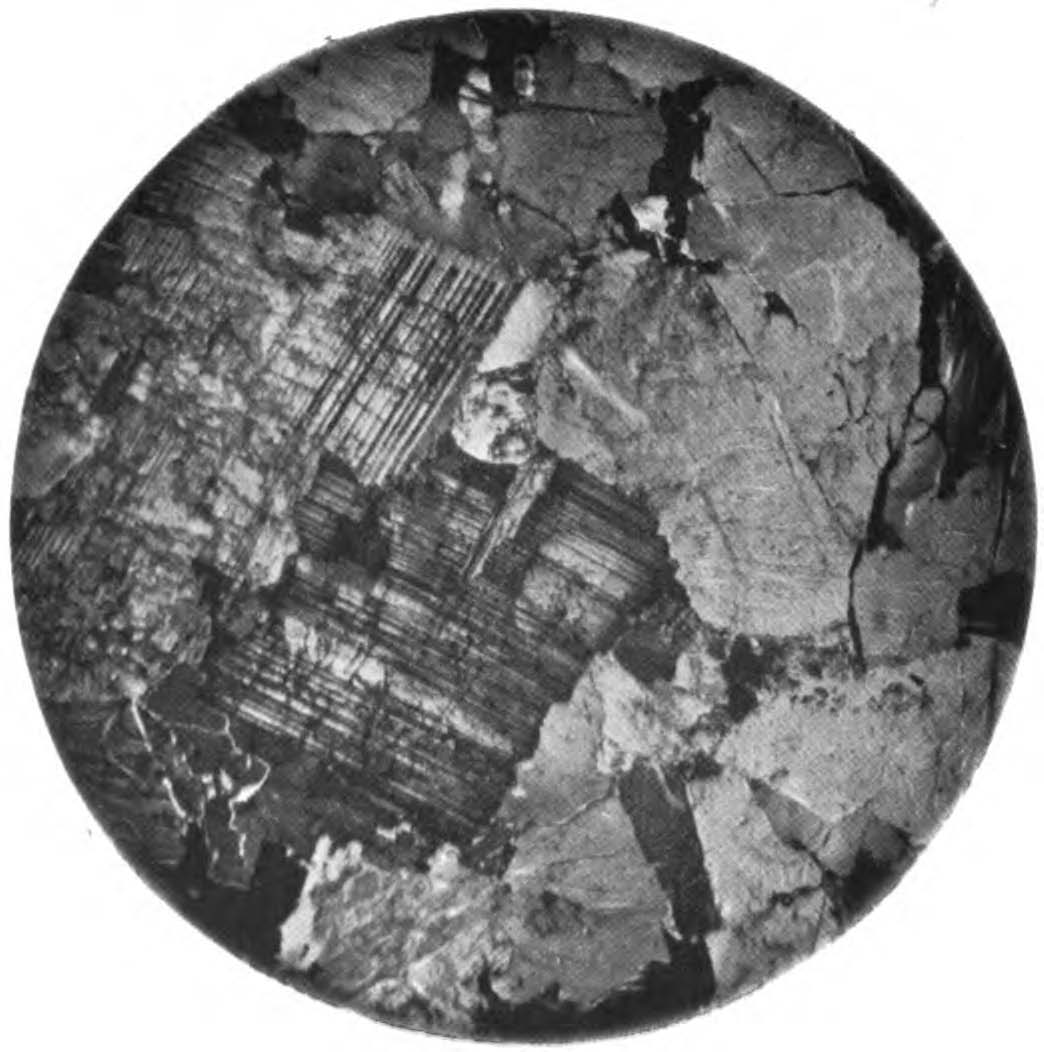
Photomicrograph of Ellicott City Granodiorite under crossed polarized light. Field represents approximately 0.85 cm.

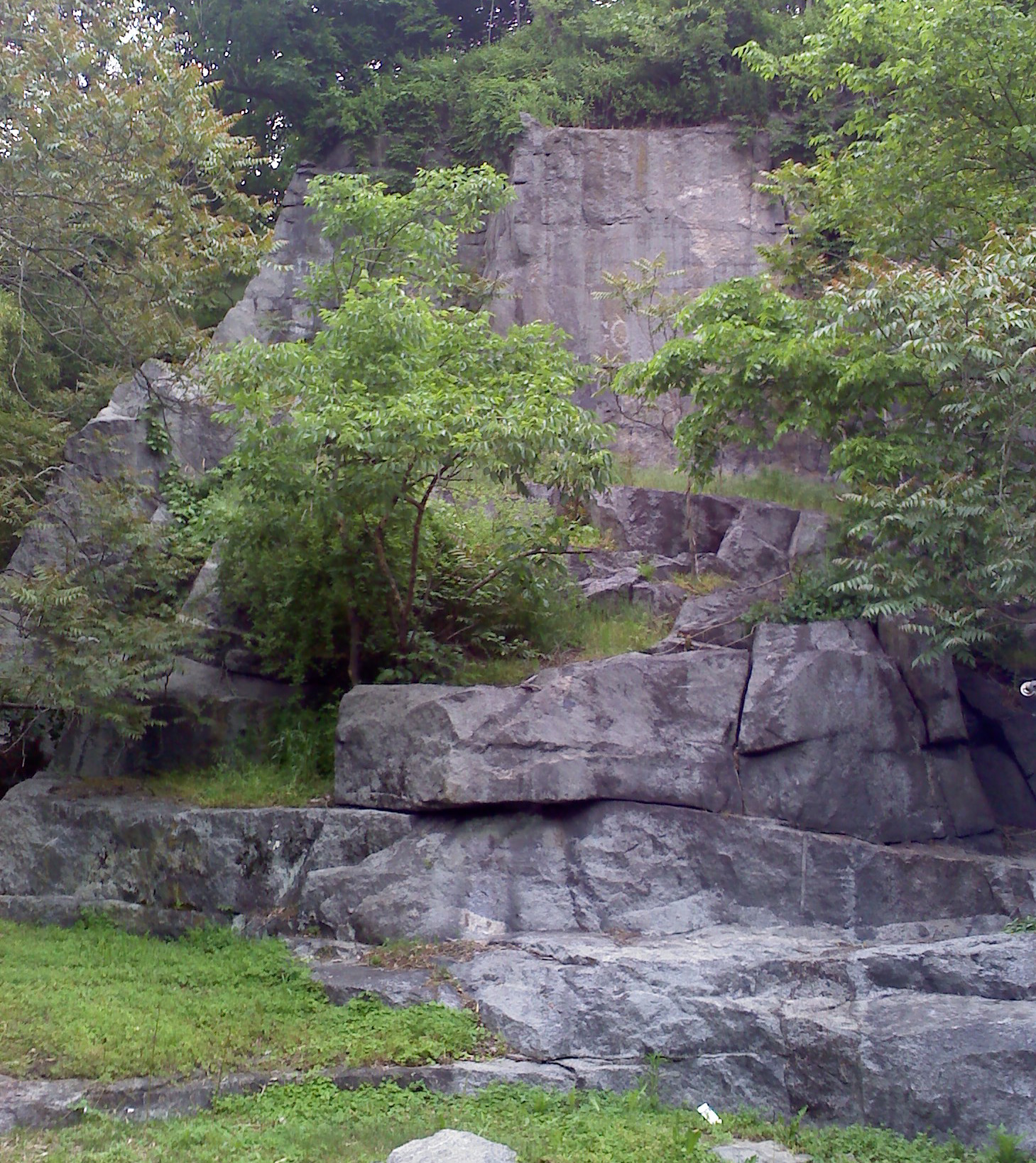
Former quarry wall of the granodiorite in Baltimore County southeast of Ellicott City

The Ellicott City Granodiorite is a Silurian or Ordovician granitic pluton in Howard and Baltimore Counties, Maryland. It is described as a biotite granodiorite along the margin of the intrusion which grades into a quartz monzonite in its core. It intrudes through the Wissahickon Formation and the Baltimore Gabbro Complex.

In 1964, C. A. Hopson grouped the Ellicott City Granodiorite with the Guilford Quartz Monzonite and the Woodstock Quartz Monzonite as "Late-kinematic intrusive masses."

In 1980, Crowley and Reinhardt of the Maryland Geological Survey remapped the Ellicott City Quadrangle and referred to this unit as the Ellicott City Granite, rather than granodiorite.

== Description ==
Hopson reported the chemical composition (by %) of the Ellicott City Granodiorite from two locations. H7-A is on River Road, 0.3 miles east of the Patapsco River Bridge, Ellicott City, and H18-1A is on U.S. Route 29, 200 yards south of U.S. Route 40.

| Chemical | % (H7-A) | % (H18-1A) |
| SiO_{2} | 63.73 | 65.39 |
| TiO_{2} | 0.52 | 0.47 |
| Al_{2}O_{3} | 17.28 | 17.13 |
| Fe_{2}O_{3} | 1.05 | 0.57 |
| FeO | 3.02 | 2.73 |
| MnO | 0.07 | 0.04 |
| MgO | 2.24 | 1.61 |
| CaO | 3.81 | 3.38 |
| Na_{2}O | 3.63 | 3.47 |
| K_{2}O | 3.53 | 3.90 |
| H_{2}O^{+} | 1.02 | 0.76 |
| H_{2}O^{−} | 0.04 | 0.03 |
| CO_{2} | 0.00 | 0.1 |
| P_{2}O_{5} | 0.28 | 0.23 |

== Early quarrying ==
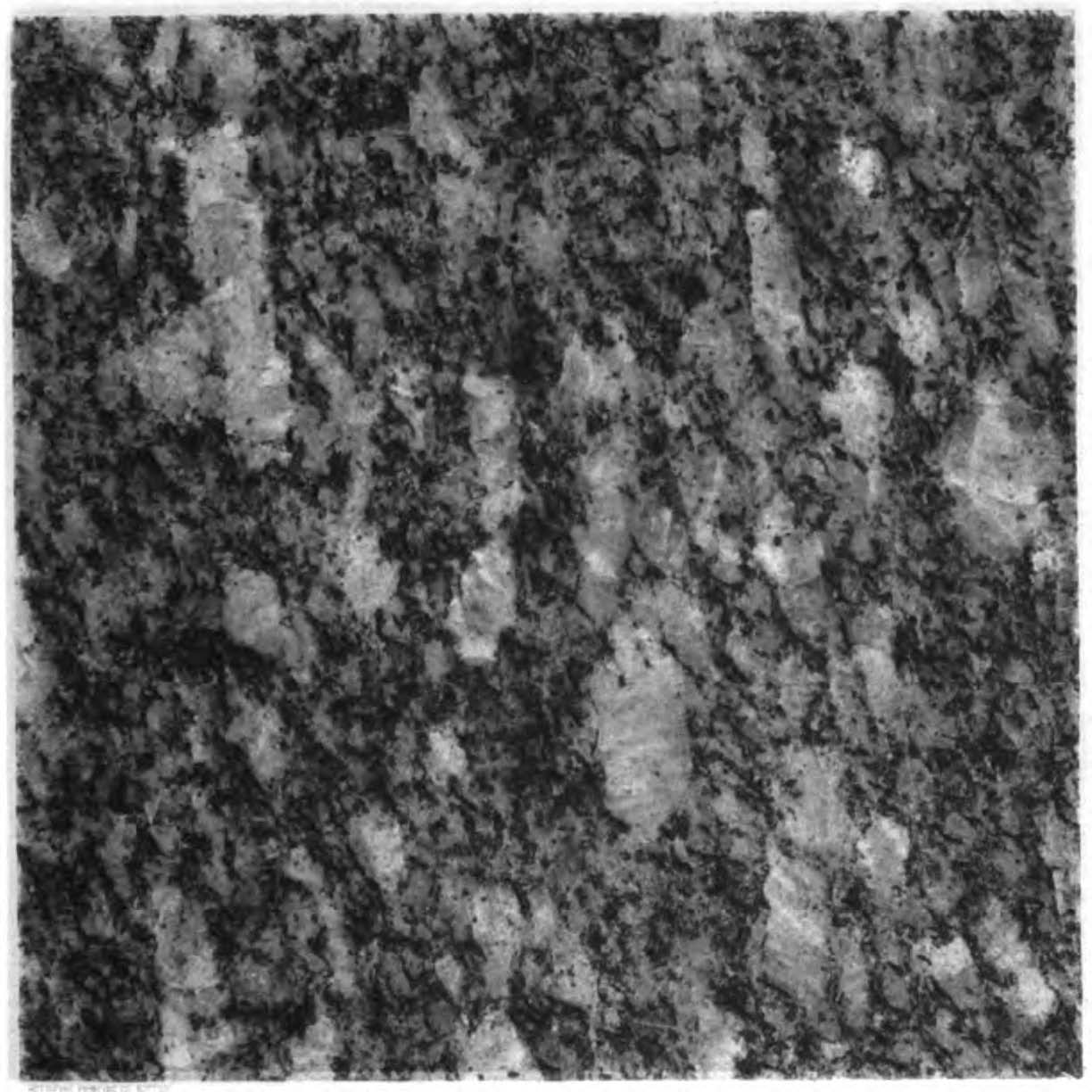
Polished slab of porphyritic granite from Ellicott City (c. 1898). Width is approximately 10.7 cm.

The 1898 account of Edward B. Mathews of the Maryland Geological Survey of the quarries at Ellicott City begins with a statement that there were two quarries; one on either side of the Patapsco River. The rock on the eastern, or Baltimore County, side is "a fine grained mass, with a decided foliation or gneissic structure," while the rock on the western, or Howard County side, is "more uniform and granitic." The text also refers to the figure of the polished slab on the right: "Here it also has a porphyritic structure in consequence of the development of large flesh-colored crystals of feldspar which are disseminated somewhat irregularly through the rock, as shown in (the figure)." Mathews continued with a description of their historical importance:

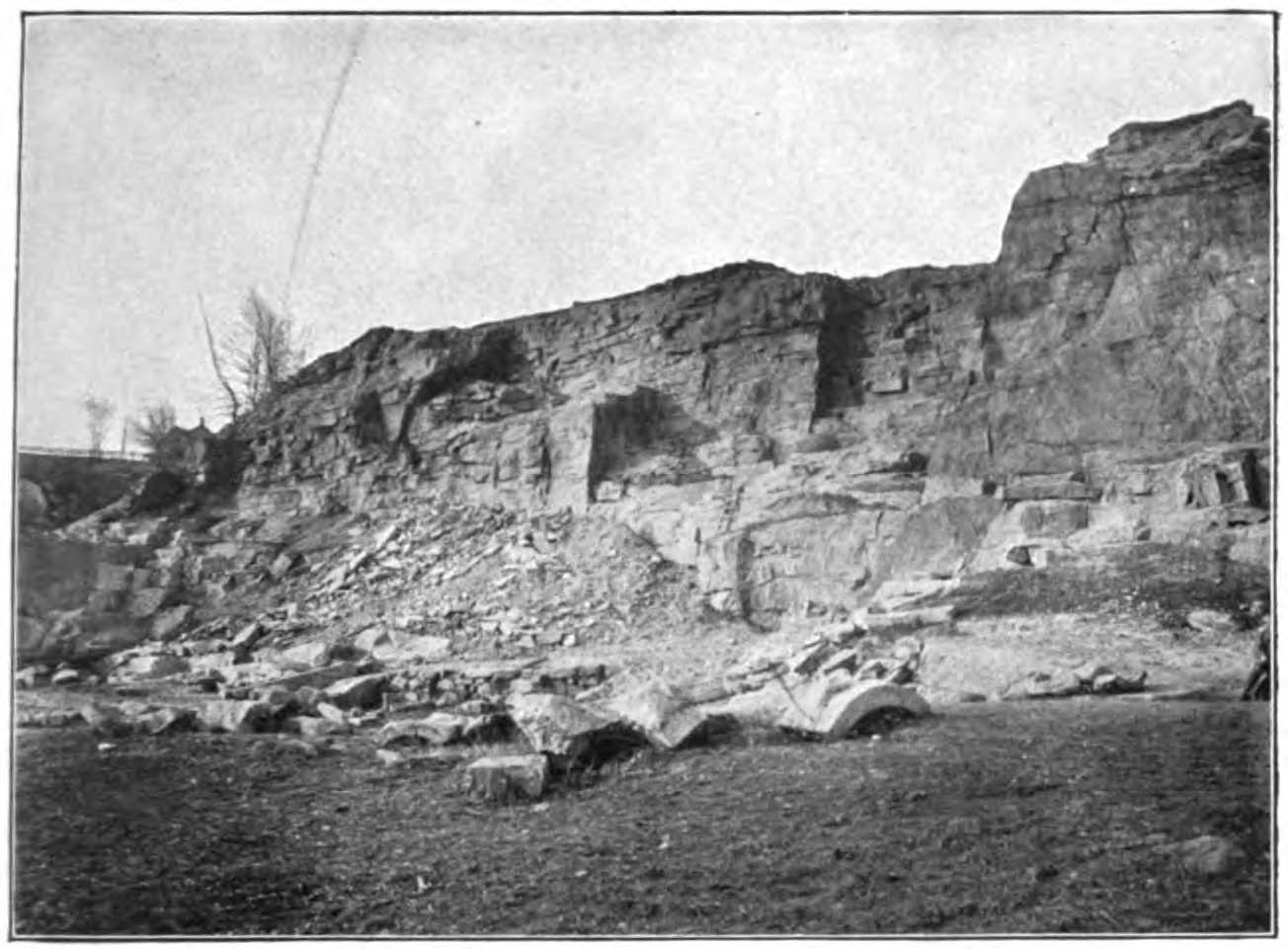
Gaither's Quarry, Ellicott City, photographed approximately 1898

The time of opening these quarries dates back probably into the last of the 18th century, but the details are entirely wanting. The beautiful appearance of some of the more uniformly porphyritic specimens early attracted attention, and in the earliest works which we have on this area, that by Dr. Hayden published in 1811, mention is made of these quarries. It is not certain whether the quarry on the Baltimore county side or the quarries of the Howard county side furnished the first material for Baltimore, but it is clearly evident from the character of the rock furnished for the Catholic Cathedral, that the gneiss was the more important rock at that time. Local tradition assigns the source of the stone sometimes to the Baltimore county side and sometimes to the Howard county side and the published information is equally conflicting and indefinite. When the Cathedral was constructed during the years 1806 to 1812 and subsequently from 1815 to 1821, the material was hauled from Ellicott City to Baltimore along the old Frederick road in huge wagons drawn by nine yoke of oxen. After furnishing the rock for this building, which must have been one of the most important stone structures in the United States at the time of its construction, the quarries evidently were worked only to meet local demands. In fact they have never since been of such relatively great importance. Dr. David Dale Owen, indeed, while studying the various building stones of Maryland at Cockeysville, Woodstock and Port Deposit, with the view of gaining all the information for the Smithsonian building, twice passed by these quarries and yet makes no mention of them. At the time of the Tenth Census the agent remarks that he "knows of no other place in the country where there are so many stone buildings in an area of the same size."

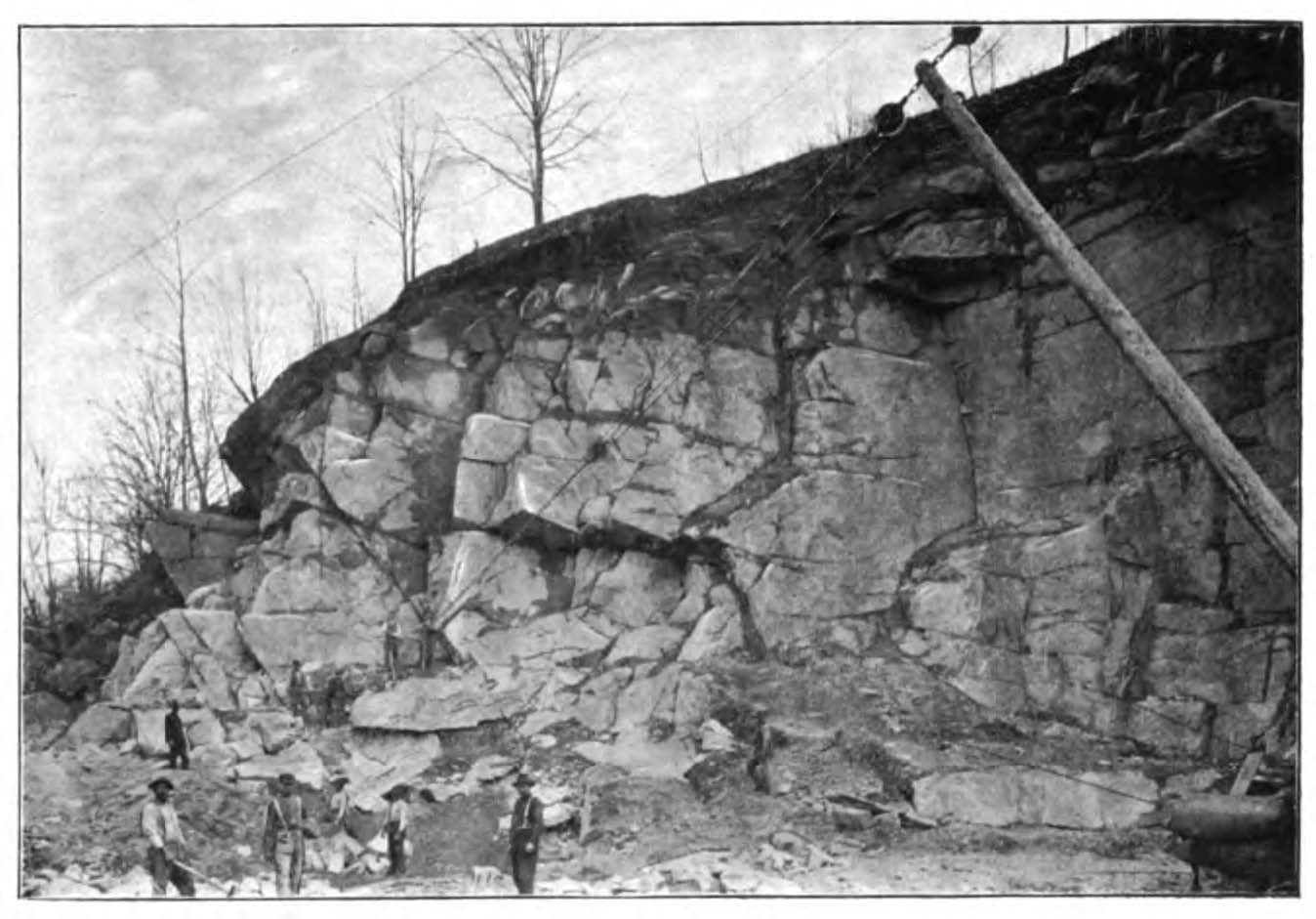
Weber's Quarry, Ellicott City, photographed approximately 1898

Mathews described recent (c. 1872-1898) operations at the quarries:

Of the quarries in operation at the present day those of Werner Bros, were opened as early as the beginning of the century. In 1872 Charles J. Werner reopened a quarry, which since his death in 1888 has been operated by his sons, who purchased in 1890 a second quarry, which had previously been opened by Robert Wilson. These quarries became of some importance in 1893, when one of them is spoken of as the principal Ellicott City quarry, although it is now producing little or no building stone except during the fall of the year when random rubble is quarried for local use. The output for the year 1896 did not aggregate over 200 perches. The most active quarry at the present is that operated by A. Weber. This quarry is situated on the Howard county side some distance below the station. The material has been furnished in recent years for some important buildings, as those of the Woman's College of Baltimore, but most of the material seems to be used for Belgian blocks, curbing and macadam.

== Age ==
In 1973, M. W. Higgins reported a radiometric (Rb-Sr age) of 425 Ma, which placed the Ellicott City Granodiorite in the Silurian. In 1998, A. A. Drake revised the age to Ordovician based on the granodiorite's relationship with the Woodstock Quartz Monzonite.

== See also ==
- Guilford Quartz Monzonite
- Oella Formation
