= Intrusive rock =

Magmatic rock formed below the surface

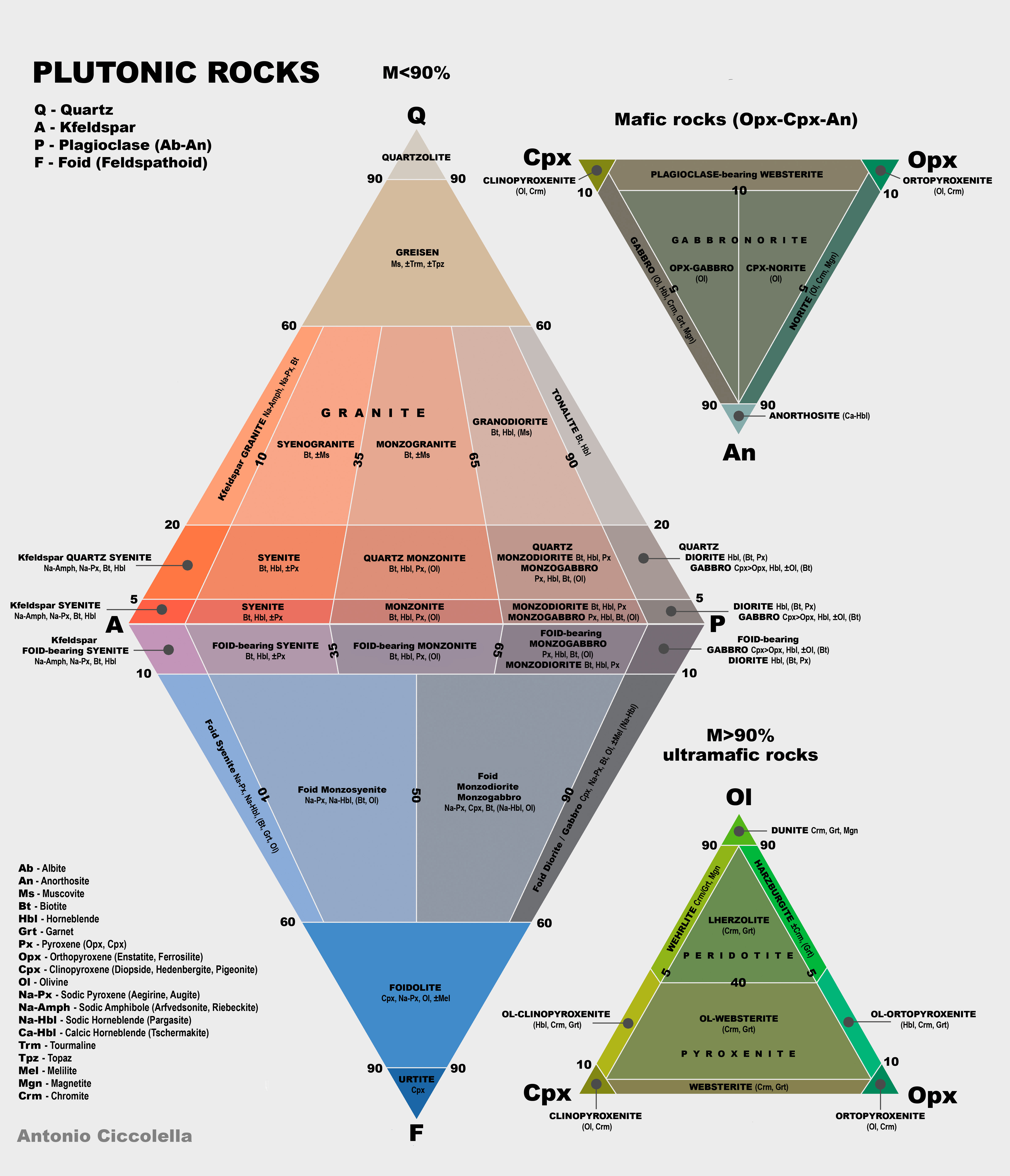
QAPF diagram for the classification of plutonic rocks

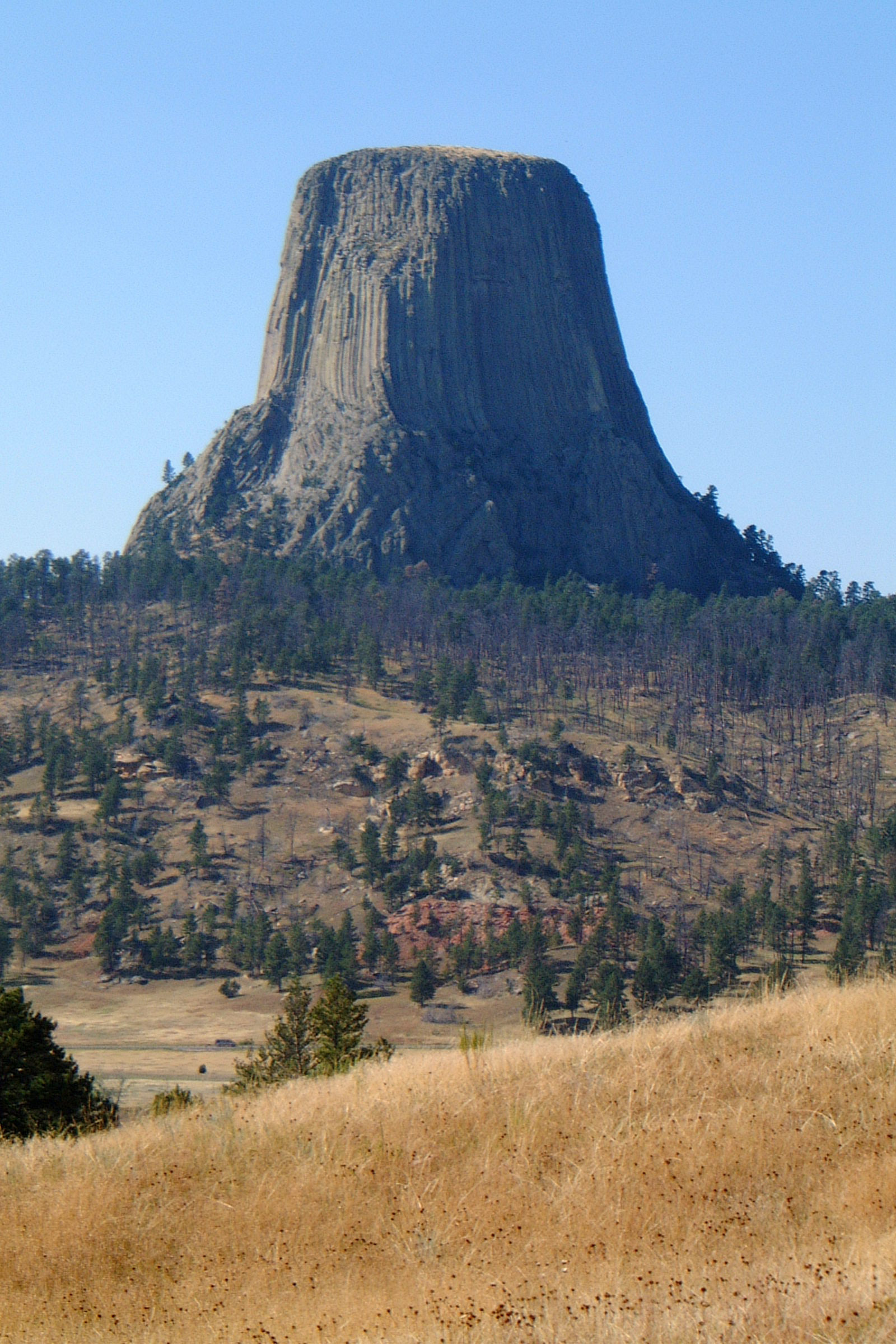
Devils Tower, United States, an igneous intrusion exposed when the surrounding softer rock eroded away

Intrusive rock is formed when magma penetrates existing rock, crystallizes, and solidifies underground to form intrusions, such as batholiths, dikes, sills, laccoliths, and volcanic necks.

Intrusion is one of the two ways igneous rock can form. The other is extrusion, such as a volcanic eruption or similar event. An intrusion is any body of intrusive igneous rock, formed from magma that cools and solidifies within the crust of the planet. In contrast, an extrusion consists of extrusive rock, formed above the surface of the crust.

Some geologists use the term plutonic rock synonymously with intrusive rock, but other geologists subdivide intrusive rock, by crystal size, into coarse-grained plutonic rock (typically formed deeper in the Earth's crust in batholiths or stocks) and medium-grained subvolcanic or hypabyssal rock (typically formed higher in the crust in dikes and sills).

== Classification ==
Because the solid country rock into which magma intrudes is an excellent insulator, cooling of the magma is extremely slow, and intrusive igneous rock is coarse-grained (phaneritic). However, the rate of cooling is greatest for intrusions at relatively shallow depth, and the rock in such intrusions is often much less coarse-grained than intrusive rock formed at greater depth. Coarse-grained intrusive igneous rocks that form at depth within the Earth are called abyssal or plutonic while those that form near the surface are called subvolcanic or hypabyssal.

Plutonic rocks are classified separately from extrusive igneous rocks, generally on the basis of their mineral content. The relative amounts of quartz, alkali feldspar, plagioclase, and feldspathoid are particularly important in classifying intrusive igneous rocks, and most plutonic rocks are classified by where they fall in the QAPF diagram. Dioritic and gabbroic rocks are further distinguished by whether the plagioclase they contain is sodium-rich, and sodium-poor gabbros are classified by their relative contents of various iron- or magnesium-rich minerals (mafic minerals) such as olivine, hornblende, clinopyroxene, and orthopyroxene, which are the most common mafic minerals in intrusive rock. Rare ultramafic rocks, which contain more than 90% mafic minerals, and carbonatite rocks, containing over 50% carbonate minerals, have their own special classifications.

Hypabyssal rocks resemble volcanic rocks more than they resemble plutonic rocks, being nearly as fine-grained, and are usually assigned volcanic rock names. However, dikes of basaltic composition often show grain sizes intermediate between plutonic and volcanic rock, and are classified as diabases or dolerites. Rare ultramafic hypabyssal rocks called lamprophyres have their own classification scheme.

== Characteristics ==
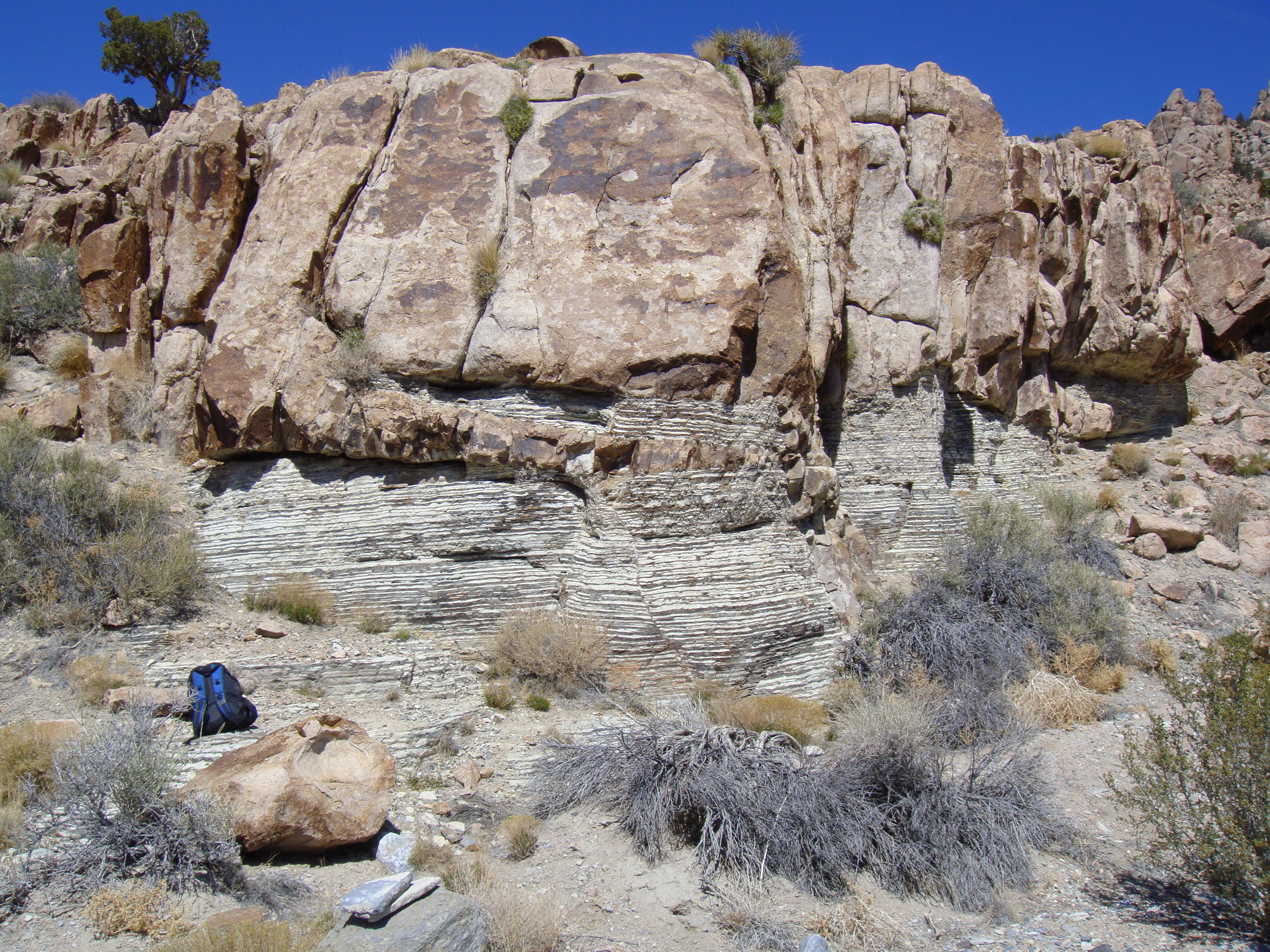
An intrusion (pink Notch Peak monzonite) inter-fingers (partly as a dike) with highly metamorphosed black-and-white-striped host rock (Cambrian carbonate rocks) near Notch Peak, House Range, Utah, United States

Intrusive rocks are characterized by large crystal sizes, and as the individual crystals are visible, the rock is called phaneritic. There are few indications of flow in intrusive rocks, since their texture and structure mostly develops in the final stages of crystallization, when flow has ended. Contained gases cannot escape through the overlying strata, and these gases sometimes form cavities, often lined with large, well-shaped crystals. These are particularly common in granites and their presence is described as miarolitic texture. Because their crystals are of roughly equal size, intrusive rocks are said to be equigranular.

Plutonic rocks are less likely than volcanic rocks to show a pronounced porphyritic texture, in which a first generation of large well-shaped crystals are embedded in a fine-grained ground-mass. The minerals of each have formed in a definite order, and each has had a period of crystallization that may be very distinct or may have coincided with or overlapped the period of formation of some of the other ingredients. Earlier crystals originated at a time when most of the rock was still liquid and are more or less perfect. Later crystals are less regular in shape because they were compelled to occupy the spaces left between the already-formed crystals. The former case is said to be idiomorphic (or automorphic); the latter is xenomorphic.

There are also many other characteristics that serve to distinguish plutonic from volcanic rock. For example, the alkali feldspar in plutonic rocks is typically orthoclase, while the higher-temperature polymorph, sanidine, is more common in volcanic rock. The same distinction holds for nepheline varieties. Leucite is common in lavas but very rare in plutonic rocks. Muscovite is confined to intrusions. These differences show the influence of the physical conditions under which crystallization takes place.

Hypabyssal rocks show structures intermediate between those of extrusive and plutonic rocks. They are very commonly porphyritic, vitreous, and sometimes even vesicular. In fact, many of them are petrologically indistinguishable from lavas of similar composition.

== Occurrences ==
Plutonic rocks form 7% of the Earth's current land surface. Intrusions vary widely, from mountain-range-sized batholiths to thin veinlike fracture fillings of aplite or pegmatite.

Diagram showing various types of igneous intrusion

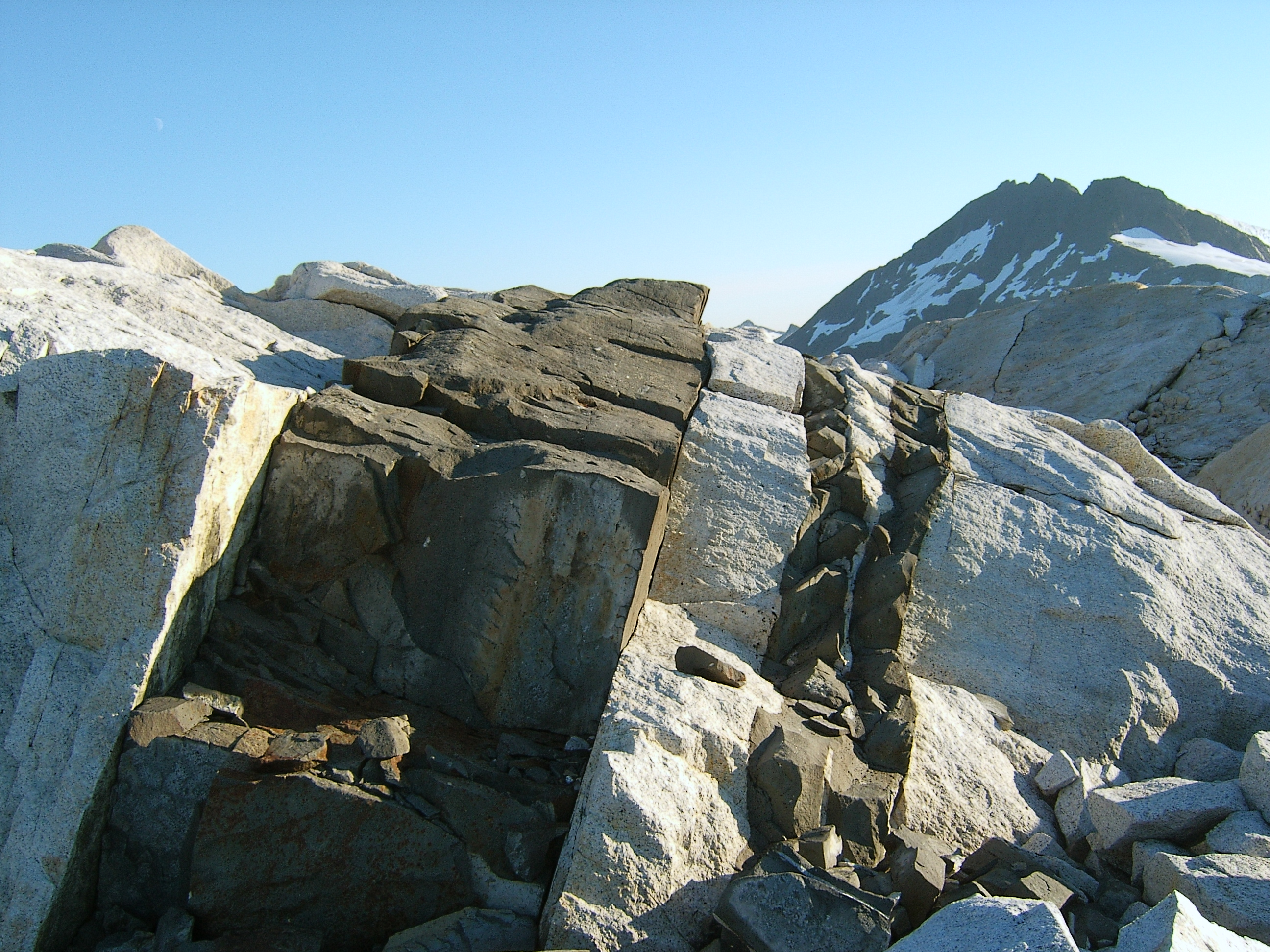
Dark dikes intruded into the country rock, Baranof Island, Alaska, United States

- Batholith: a large irregular discordant intrusion
- Chonolith: an irregularly-shaped intrusion with a demonstrable base
- Cupola: a dome-shaped projection from the top of a large subterranean intrusion
- Dike: a relatively narrow tabular discordant body, often nearly vertical
- Laccolith: concordant body with roughly flat base and convex top, usually with a feeder pipe below
- Lopolith: concordant body with roughly flat top and a shallow convex base, may have a feeder dike or pipe below
- Phacolith: a concordant lens-shaped pluton that typically occupies the crest of an anticline or trough of a syncline
- Volcanic pipe or volcanic neck: tubular, roughly vertical body that may have been a feeder vent for a volcano
- Sill: a relatively thin tabular concordant body intruded along bedding planes
- Stock: a smaller irregular discordant intrusive
  - Boss: a small stock

== See also ==
- Ellicott City Granodiorite
- Guilford Quartz Monzonite
- Pluton emplacement
- Norbeck Intrusive Suite
- Subvolcanic rock
- Tuolumne Intrusive Suite
- Volcanic rock
- Woodstock Quartz Monzonite
