= Baltimore Gabbro Complex =

Baltimore Gabbro
- Stratigraphic range: Late Precambrian
- Type: Igneous

Location
- Region: Piedmont of Maryland
- Extent: Howard and Baltimore Counties

Type section
- Named for: Baltimore, Maryland
- Named by: G. H. Williams 1866

Baltimore Gabbro Complex is a hypersthene gabbro with subordinate amounts of olivine gabbro, norite, anorthositic gabbro, and pyroxenite. Igneous minerals and textures are well preserved in some rocks, and other rocks exhibit varying degrees of alteration and recrystallization with a new metamorphic mineral assemblage.

== Early Quarrying ==
Baltimore Gabbro Complex was an early roadbed material for the Central Maryland Region. It was specified as "trap". It was mined in the Stoney Forest area of Harford and Cecil Counties, along the Susquehanna in Baltimore and as far south as Laurel.

In 1996, Kingdon Gould III's Laurel Sand and Gravel company which includes Fairfax Materials, Allegany Aggregates, Laurel Asphalt and S.W. Barrick & Sons purchased the 600 acres chase property north of the historic town of Savage, Maryland. The site is home to the Savage Stone quarry, mining Baltimore Gabbro for road bed construction. The material is amble to support 50,000 pounds per square inch for road construction. The facility started operations in 2005 after special zoning approval with a 25-year reserve in materials.

== Age ==
Baltimore Gabbro Complex is Paleozoic, post-lower Ordovician.

== See also ==
- Woodstock Quartz Monzonite
- Guilford Quartz Monzonite
