= Kanggurtag gold belt =

Gold belt in Eastern Tianshan, China

The Kanggurtag gold belt is a gold belt in the Eastern Tianshan portion of the Xinjiang province of Northwestern China. During the late Proterozoic, the Tarim plate and the Junggar plate collided, creating the Tianshan mountains. Around 276 Ma, the collision related stress regime ended and was replaced by dextral slip movement that lasted from 276 to 239 Ma. During the strike-slip period in the region, the Kanggurtag gold belt formed during the late Carboniferous-early Permian. This gold belt is separated into three groups: shear zoned dominated gold deposits, epithermal gold deposits, and intrusion related gold deposits.

== Geology ==
The shear related deposits formed from magmatism derived from shear melting that resulted in dynamometamorphic fluids. The ore baring fluid was a mixture of dynamometamorphic water, magmatic water, and meteoric water. The gold baring ore deposited within the shear zones, came from two different sources: a deep-seated source and surrounding volcanic rocks. The shear related deposit is the central ore body and is flanked by the epithermal gold to the west and intrusive related gold to the east. The two latter deposits are influenced by extensional forces from the outer areas of the shear zone.

The early Permian epithermal gold deposit was derived mainly from meteoric water that filled in the fractures established from volcanic edifices and the regional faulting. Due to the low sulfide content of the ore, mineralization occurred within fissures of microcrystalline quartz grains of a monzonite porphyry and a quartz-feldspar porphyry. Gold ore was also deposited as veins, stockworks and breccias within the surrounding stratigraphy due to the faulting. The transport of the gold ore was facilitated by the lower portion of the fracture system but hampered by the upper portion which acted as a natural trap for fluid accumulation.

The early Carboniferous intrusive related gold deposits originate from a series of porphyries of granite, quartz-syenite, and tonalite. The ore from the intrusion deposited within the brittle ductile shear zone by magmatic fluids. The area of gold deposition from the intrusive body is small but the gold centration is significant.
