= Quartz monzonite =

Type of igneous rock

- Igneous rock
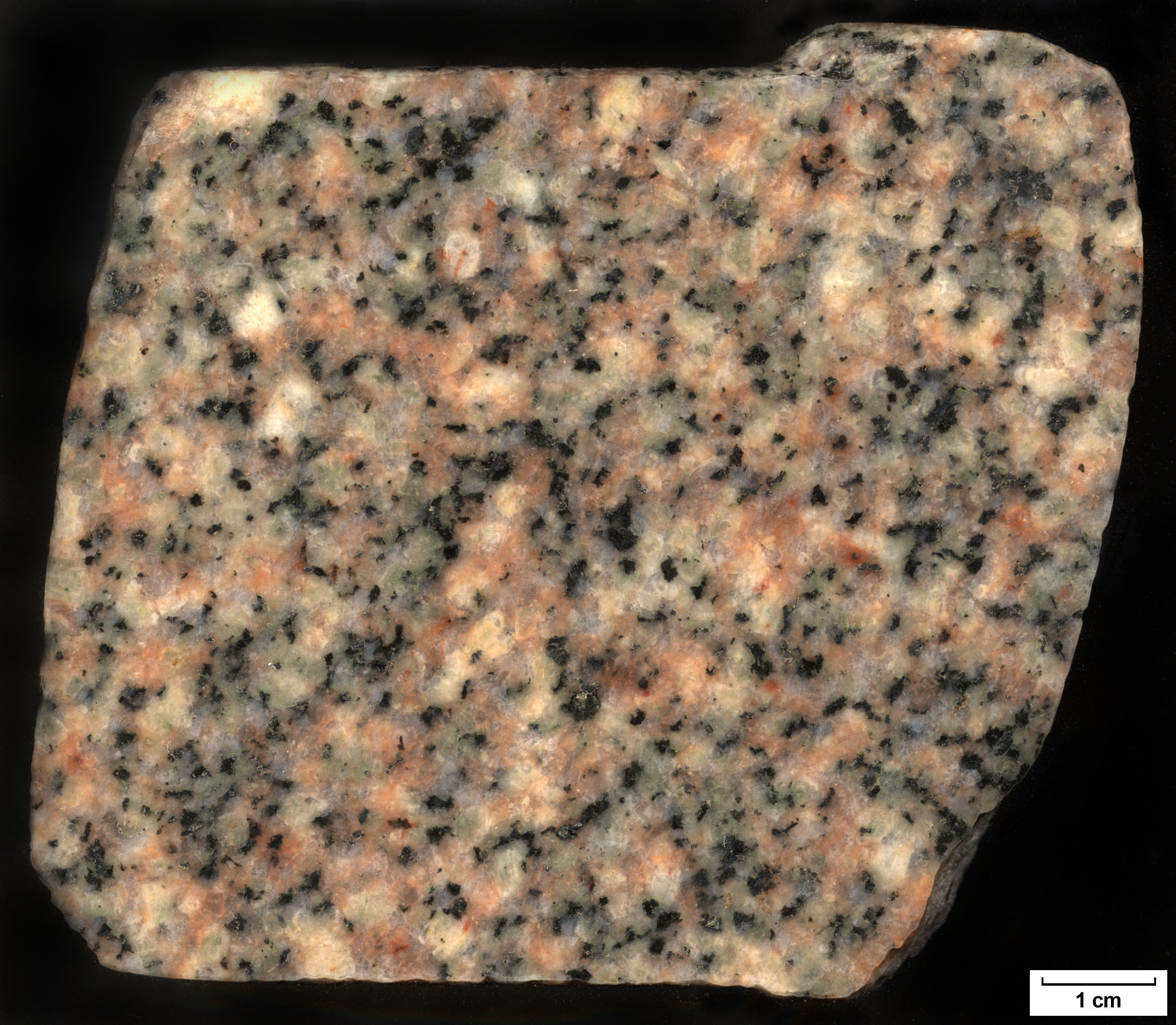
- Quartz monzonite bedrock from a USGS drill core at western Cape Cod, Massachusetts

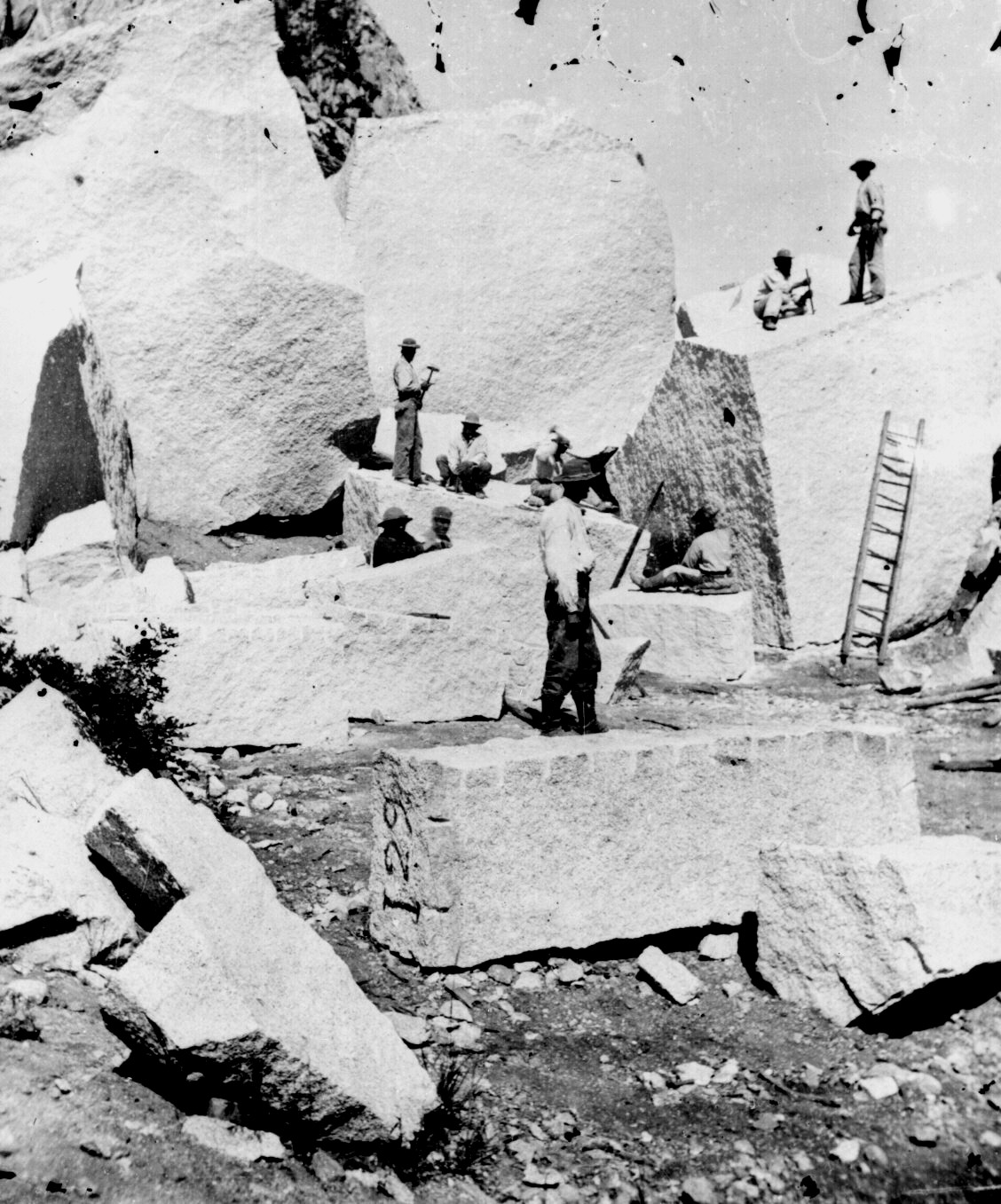
Quarry for the Salt Lake Temple with boulders and detached masses being worked by stone cutters

Quartz monzonite is an intrusive, felsic, igneous rock that has an approximately equal proportion of orthoclase and plagioclase feldspars. It is typically a light colored phaneritic (coarse-grained) to porphyritic granitic rock. The plagioclase is typically intermediate to sodic in composition, andesine to oligoclase. Quartz is present in significant amounts. Biotite and/or hornblende constitute the dark minerals. Because of its coloring, it is often confused with granite, but whereas granite contains more than 20% quartz, quartz monzonite is only 5–20% quartz. Rock with less than five percent quartz is classified as monzonite. A rock with more alkali feldspar is a syenite whereas one with more plagioclase is a quartz diorite. The fine grained volcanic rock equivalent of quartz monzonite is quartz latite.

The term adamellite was originally applied by A. Cathrein in 1890 to orthoclase-bearing tonalite (likely a granodiorite) at Monte Adamello, Italy, in 1890, but later came to refer to quartz monzonite. The term is now deprecated.

Quartz monzonite porphyry is often associated with copper mineralization in the porphyry copper ore deposits.

== Geographic distribution ==
=== United States ===
In the White Mountains and western highlands of New Hampshire, the Kinsman Quartz Monzonite is an extensive formation that underlies Kinsman Mountain, parts of Franconia Notch, Mount Cardigan, and Mount Sunapee.

Stone Mountain in Georgia is a large quartz monzonite monadnock.

Quartz monzonite extracted from a quarry in Little Cottonwood Canyon was used to build several buildings in Salt Lake City, Utah, including the Church of Jesus Christ of Latter-day Saints' Salt Lake Temple, Church Administration Building, and Conference Center, as well as the Utah State Capitol.

The large boulders of Joshua Tree National Park in southern California are quartz monzonite.

A large pluton in the Atlanta lobe of the Idaho Batholith, near McCall, Idaho, is made of quartz monzonite.

The Guilford Quartz Monzonite and Woodstock Quartz Monzonite, probably comagmatic, are located in central Maryland.

=== Australia ===
In Queensland, Castle Hill, Mount Stuart and Mount Louisa around Townsville represent a large quartz monzonite province.
