= Woodstock Quartz Monzonite =

- Stratigraphic range: Silurian or Ordovician
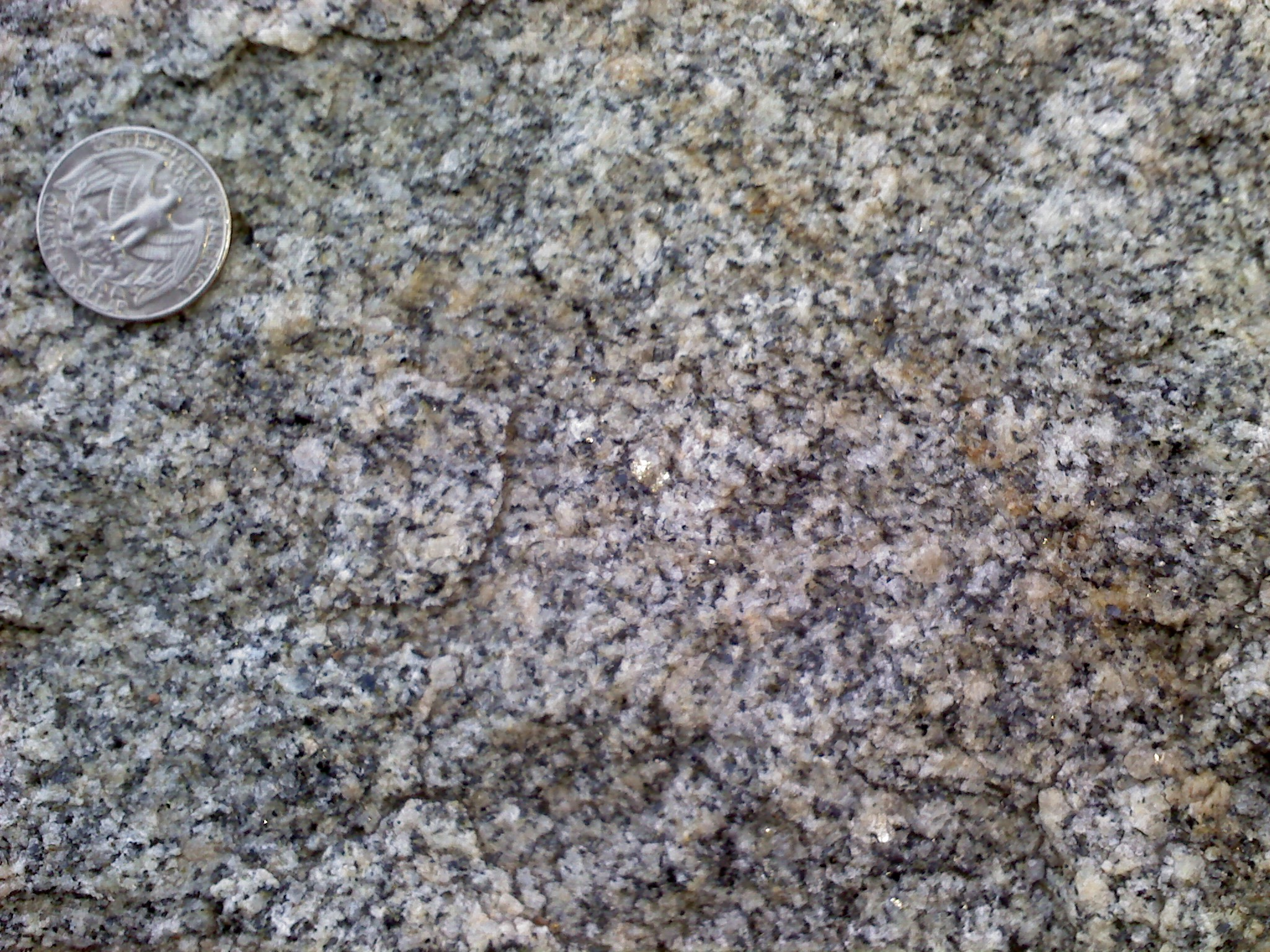
- Photographed on a boulder in Granite, Maryland
- Type: igneous
- Area: ~400 Ha

Lithology
- Primary: monzonite

Location
- Region: Piedmont of Maryland
- Country: United States
- Extent: Western Baltimore County

Type section
- Named for: Woodstock, Maryland
- Named by: Williams and Darton, 1892

The Woodstock Quartz Monzonite is a Silurian or Ordovician quartz monzonite pluton in Baltimore County, Maryland. It is described as a massive biotite-quartz monzonite which intrudes through the Baltimore Gneiss at a single locality surrounding the town of Granite, Maryland.

The extent of this intrusion was originally mapped in 1892 as the "Woodstock granite". It was given its current name in 1964 by C. A. Hopson. Hopson grouped the Woodstock Quartz Monzonite with the Ellicott City Granodiorite and the Guilford Quartz Monzonite as "Late-kinematic intrusive masses."

Woodstock granite has been used in the Capitol Building, the Library of Congress, and in buildings in Baltimore.

== Description ==
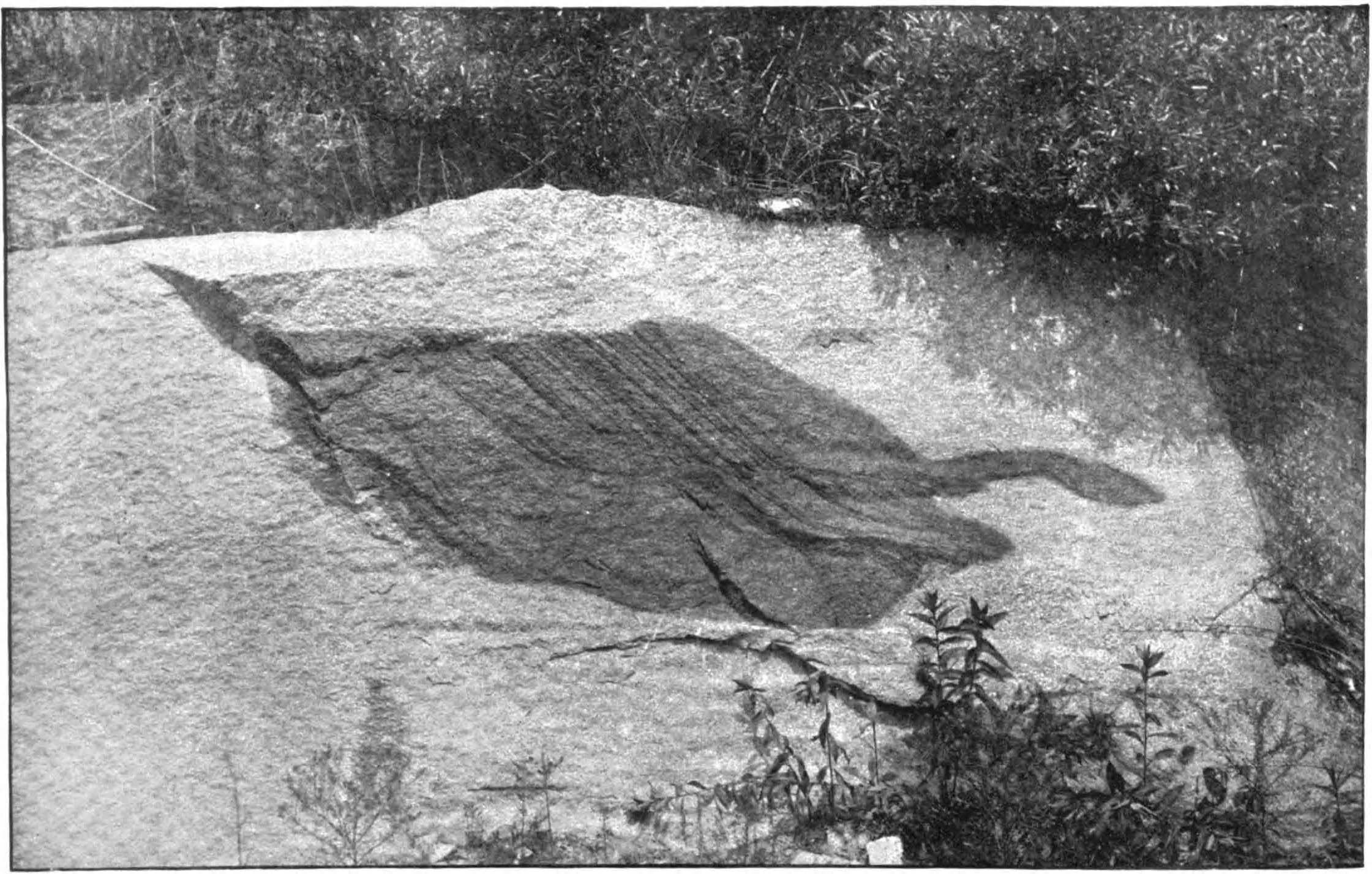
Inclusion (Xenolith) of Baltimore Gneiss in a wall of Waltersville Quarry (c. 1895.)

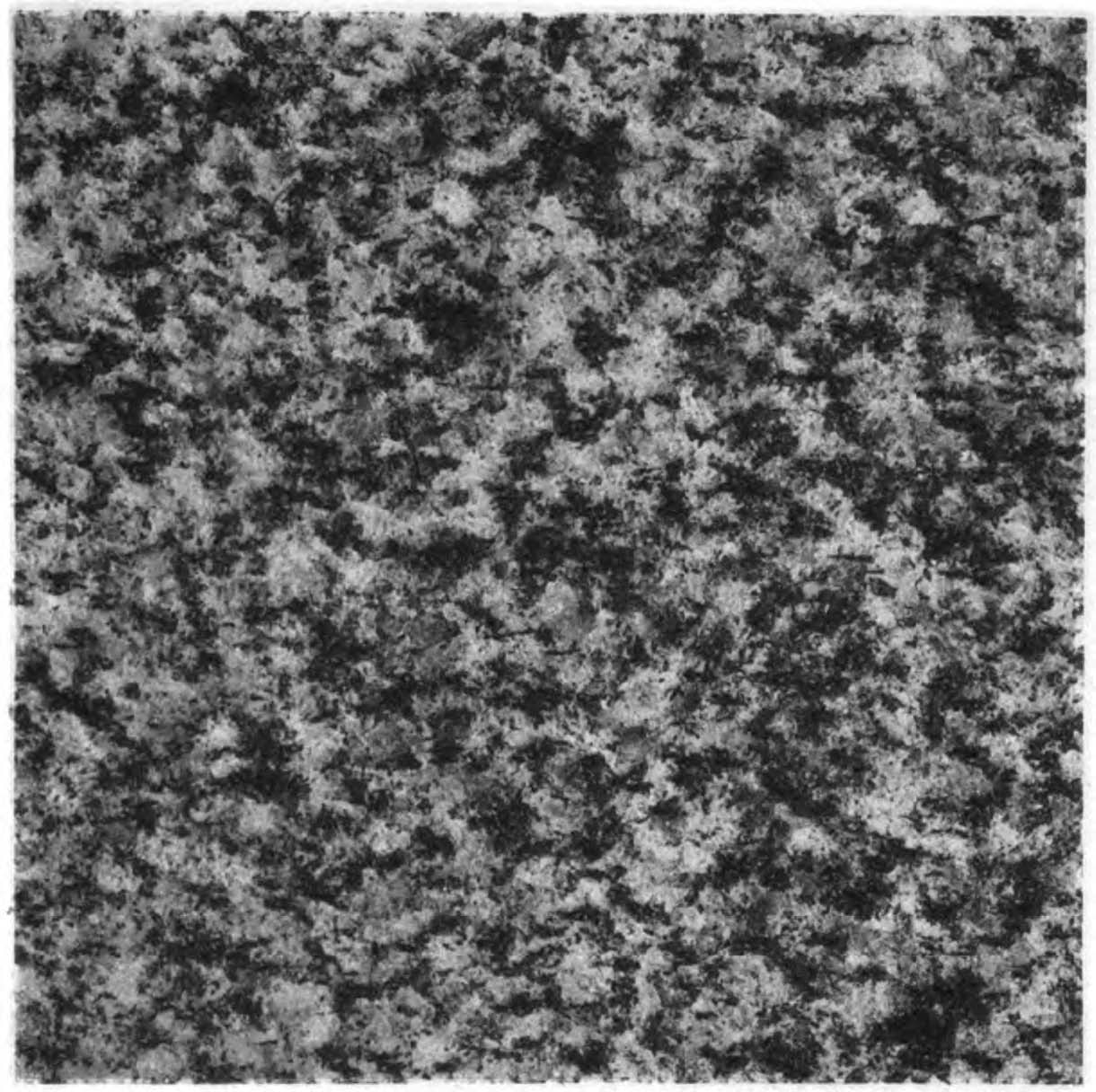
Polished slab from one of the quarries in Granite (1898). Width is about 10.7 cm.

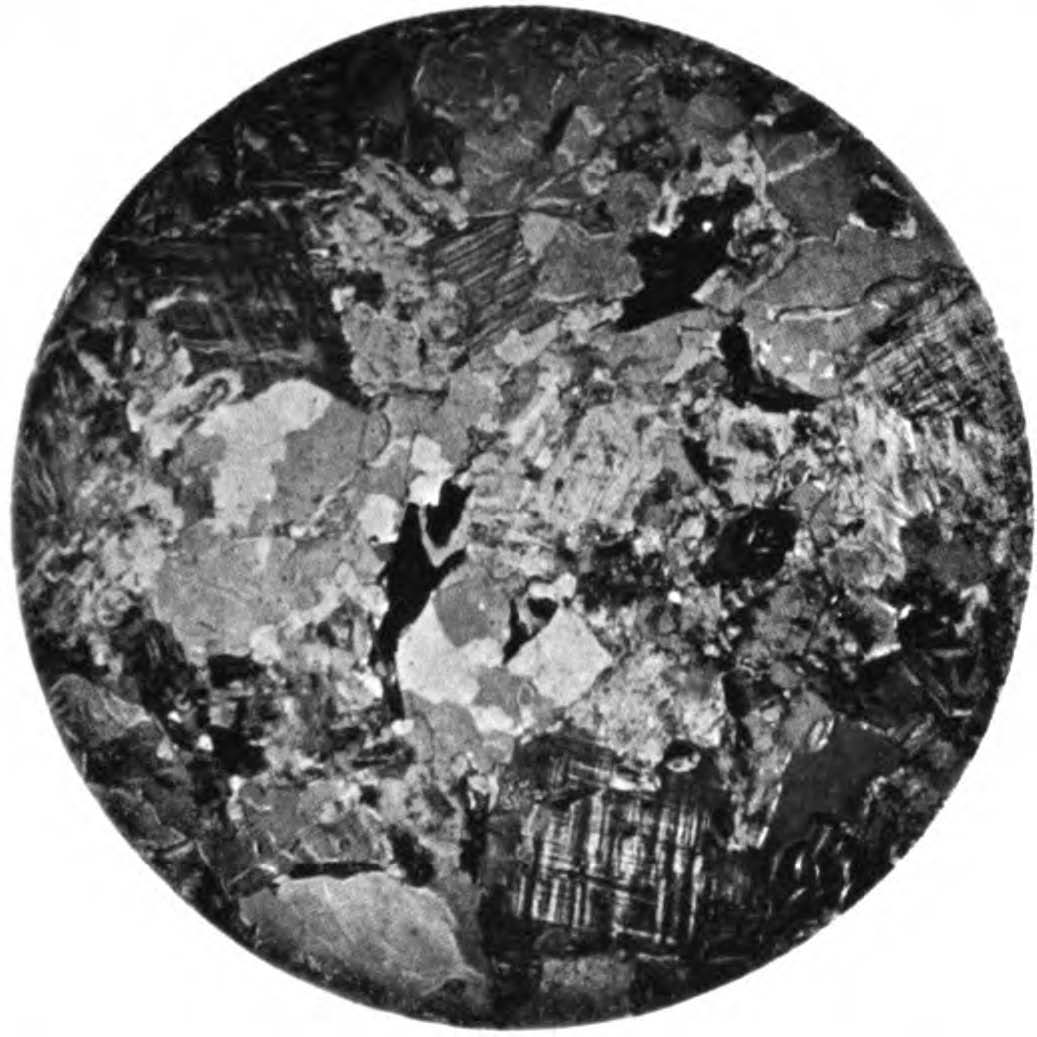
Photomicrograph of the Woodstock Quartz Monzonite. Field is about 0.85 cm, under crossed polarized light (1898)

The Woodstock Quartz Monzonite was described in 1898 as "perhaps the best granite in Maryland for general building purposes" by Edward B. Mathews of the Maryland Geological Survey. Mathews described the mapped extent of the granite and inclusions of gneiss within it as follows:

The granite mass as indicated by the map forms a more or less oval, isolated area of granite extending scarcely two miles northeast and southwest and a mile northwest and southeast. Although so small, it is one of the most important economic areas within the state. This mass of granite, which is evidently intruded into the gneisses, is entirely enveloped by them and sends no dikes or apophyses into the surrounding rock. That the gneiss is really older than the granite is shown by the great number of inclusions found within the latter. These are chiefly of gneiss, and they occur often in huge irregular blocks six to eight or even ten feet in size, showing narrow rims due to contact metamorphism. They are beautifully puckered and wrinkled and being much richer in ferro-magnesian silicates than the granite itself, their irregular outlines contrast sharply with the lighter background.

Mathews described the granite itself as follows:

The appearance of the Woodstock granite is well represented in (the polished slab shown at right) which reproduces the polished surface in natural size. The color of the rock is bright gray, with something of a luster imparted by the quartz and the unaltered feldspars, the latter often giving an additional faint pink tone. The mica occurs in evenly disseminated fine black flakes which emphasize the grain of the rock and only slightly subdue the bright fresh aspect of the stone. The size of the constituent grains which varies from 0.05-0.2 inches in length, and from 0.01-0.10 inches in breadth, for quartz and feldspar, is little marred by the less resistant mica wearing away and leaving small depressions, that are scarcely discernible to the naked eye. The polished surfaces, such as are represented in (the same figure), are darker than the rough or ashlar finished stone.

Hopson reported the chemical composition (by %) of the Woodstock Quartz Diorite from the "Sylvan Dell Quarry" (probably the Waltersville Quarry) in Granite, Maryland, as follows:

| Chemical | % | Chemical | % |
| SiO_{2} | 71.01 | CaO | 2.32 |
| TiO_{2} | 0.30 | Na_{2}O | 3.59 |
| Al_{2}O_{3} | 14.46 | K_{2}O | 4.38 |
| Fe_{2}O_{3} | 1.17 | H_{2}O^{+} | 0.62 |
| FeO | 1.44 | H_{2}O^{−} | 0.03 |
| MnO | 0.04 | CO_{2} | 0.10 |
| MgO | 0.70 | P_{2}O_{5} | 0.12 |

== Early quarrying ==
The Walters/Blunt family of Waltersville (later Granite, Maryland) "founded the local quarrying industry circa 1820."

The 1898 account of Edward B. Mathews of the Maryland Geological Survey of the quarries at Granite (formerly known as Waltersville) begins with boulders attracting the attention of "several enterprising men from New Hampshire," (Sweatt, Putney, and Riddle) who commenced quarrying operations about 1832-33, and supplied stone to the Baltimore and Ohio Railroad. He continued:

Although prospecting has been carried on ever since, only two ledge quarries have been discovered, viz.: the "Waltersville" and "Fox Rock." The former is the principal one, and was at first called the "Branch." This rock developed into a fine ledge, surpassing all the granite around in quantity, quality and easy access, so that all the boulders in which Sweatt, Putney and Riddle were interested were at once abandoned. After working it for a year or two Putney and Riddle obtained a lease of this quarry for twenty years in August, 1835, from the owner, Captain Alexander Walters, to whose family this quarry has belonged for more than a century. It is called in the lease and is still known as the Waltersville quarry, although the name of the village of Waltersville was changed to Granite about 1873-74, when the first post-office at the place was established. The lessees went to work vigorously, and besides many other improvements, built a railroad two miles long to connect with the Baltimore and Ohio at Putney and Riddle's bridge, about one mile east of Woodstock. Their first contract of importance was furnishing stone for the Baltimore Custom House. They, however, continued the business only a few years. Extravagance and mismanagement caused the failure, and they were succeeded by Edward Green and Joshua B. Sumwalt, under the firm-name of Green & Sumwalt. The senior partner dying about 1849, he was succeeded by his son Frederick, and the firm became Sumwalt & Green, who conducted the business until 1865, when Attwood Blunt, whose wife owned the property, took charge and continued the business until 1871, when the quarry was leased to Ansley Gill and James McMahon. After a lapse of about sixteen years, the firm was dissolved by the death of McMahon. Mr. Gill continued the business alone for a short while, when he associated with him Wm. H. Johnson, of Baltimore, and they soon after formed with George Mann, Hugh Hanna, Messrs. Grey & Sons, of Philadelphia, and Mr. Hamilton of Baltimore, a joint stock company, calling it the Guilford and Waltersville Granite Co. This company is now (in 1898) conducting the business.

"The two largest quarries were Waltersville and Fox Rock. These and smaller quarries counted hundreds of stonecutters among their employees." The quarries near Granite were "most active after 1875."

=== Images of the quarries ===
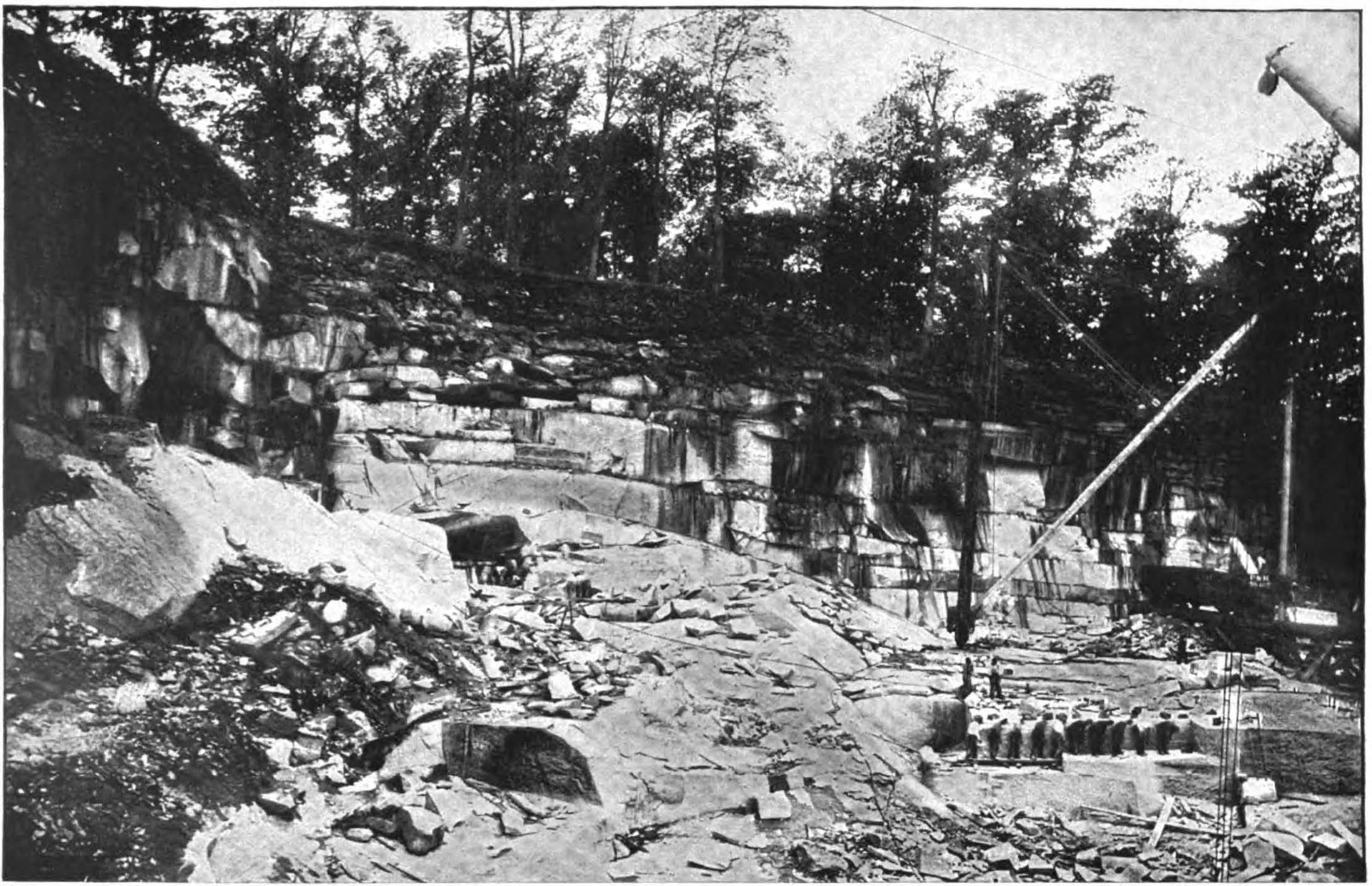
Waltersville Quarry (c. 1895)

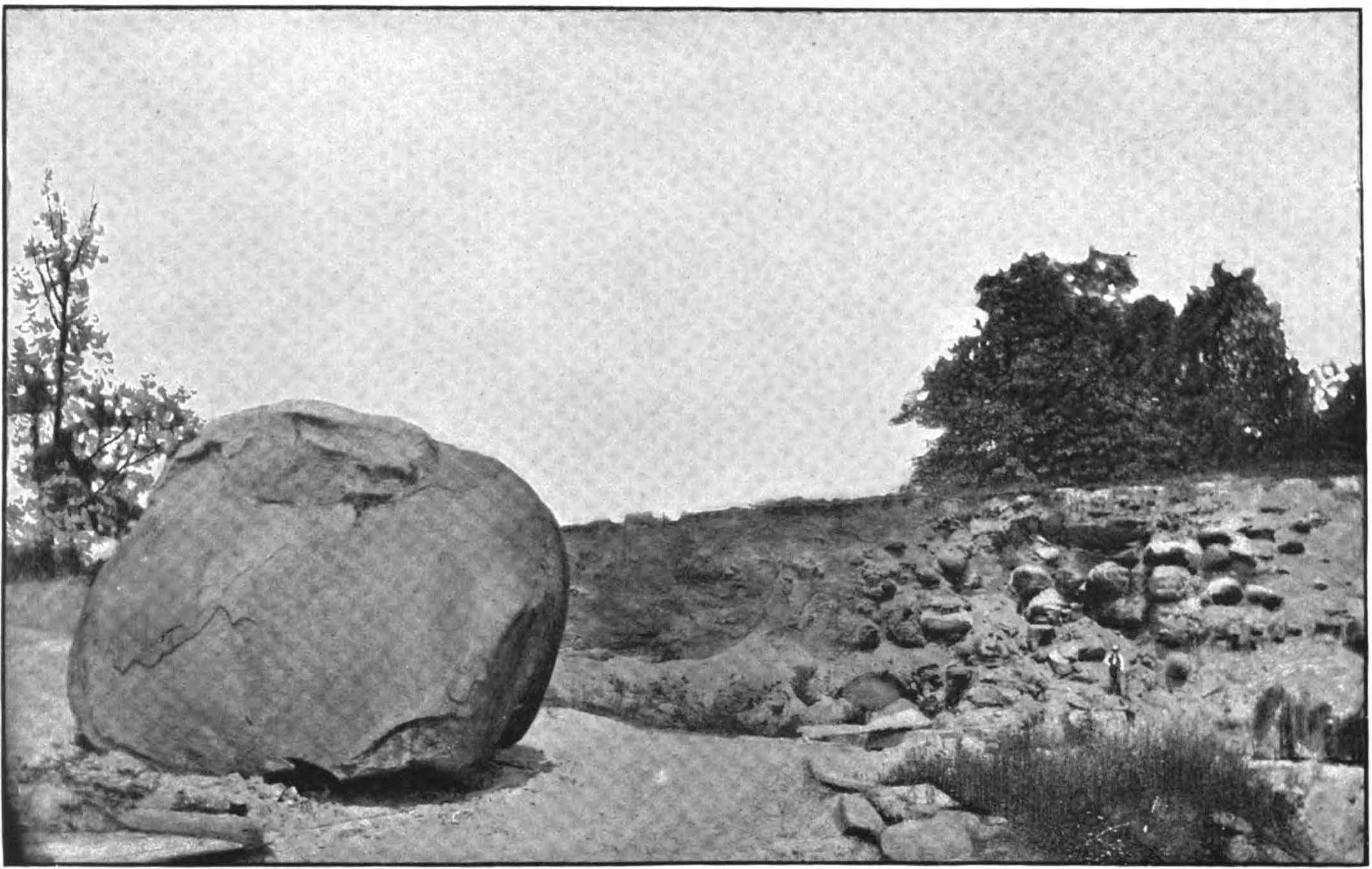
Middle Granite Quarry (Weller's Quarry), showing spherical weathering of the granite (c. 1895)

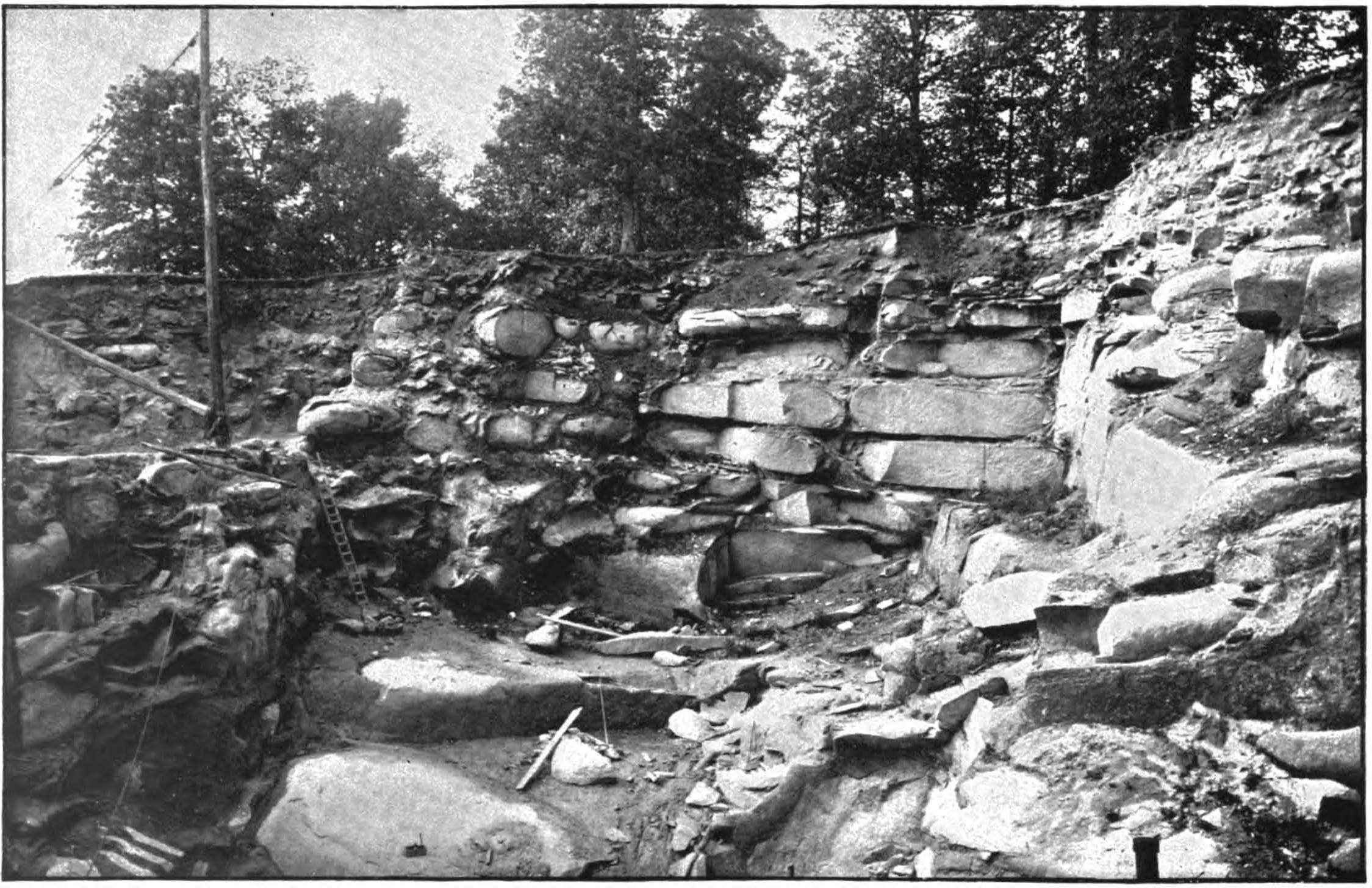
Middle Granite Quarry (Weller's Quarry), showing concentric shells of granite (c. 1895)

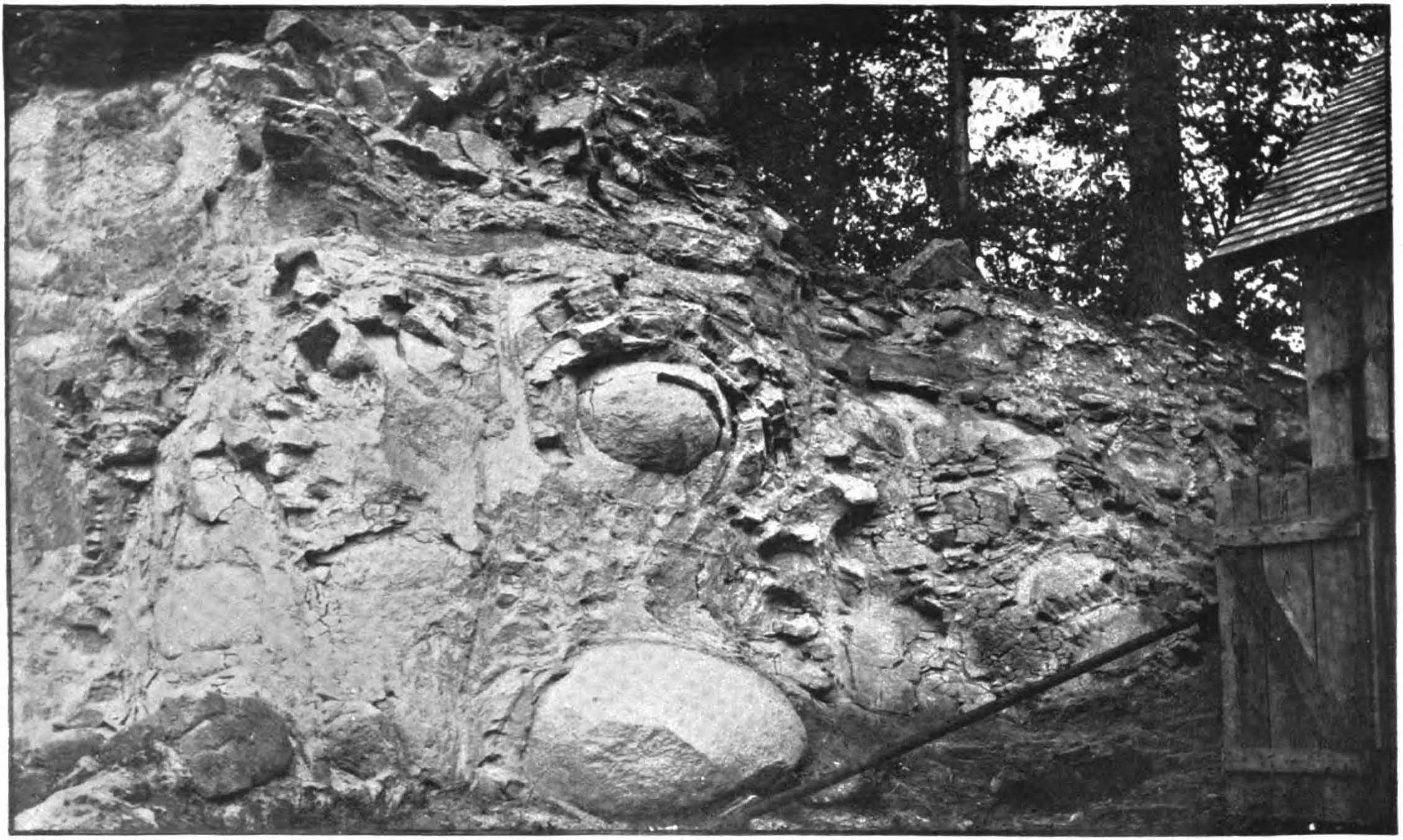
Middle Granite Quarry (Weller's Quarry), showing "boulders of disintegration" (c. 1895)

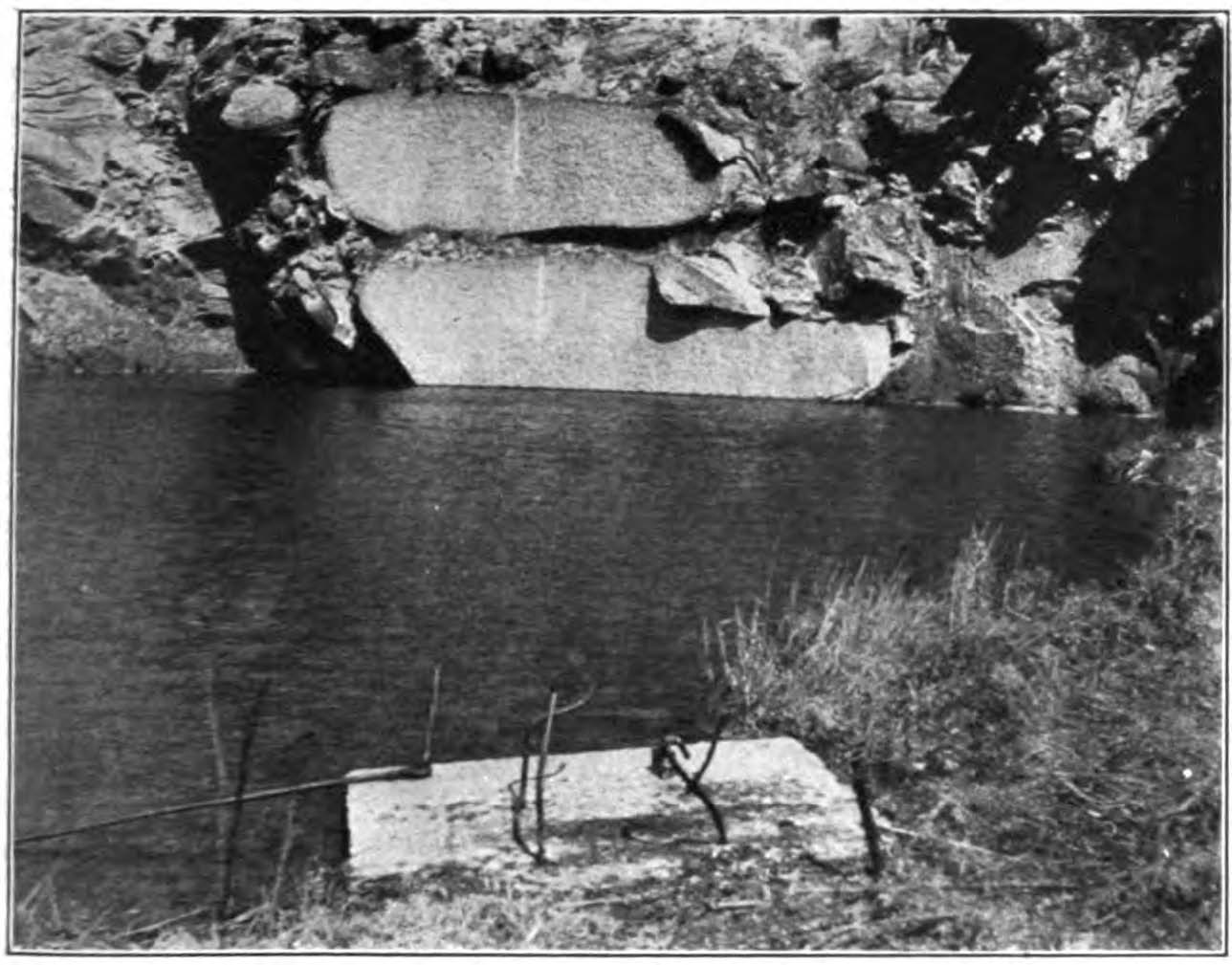
Middle Granite Quarry (Weller's Quarry), showing concentric shells of granite after flooding of the quarry (c. 1910)

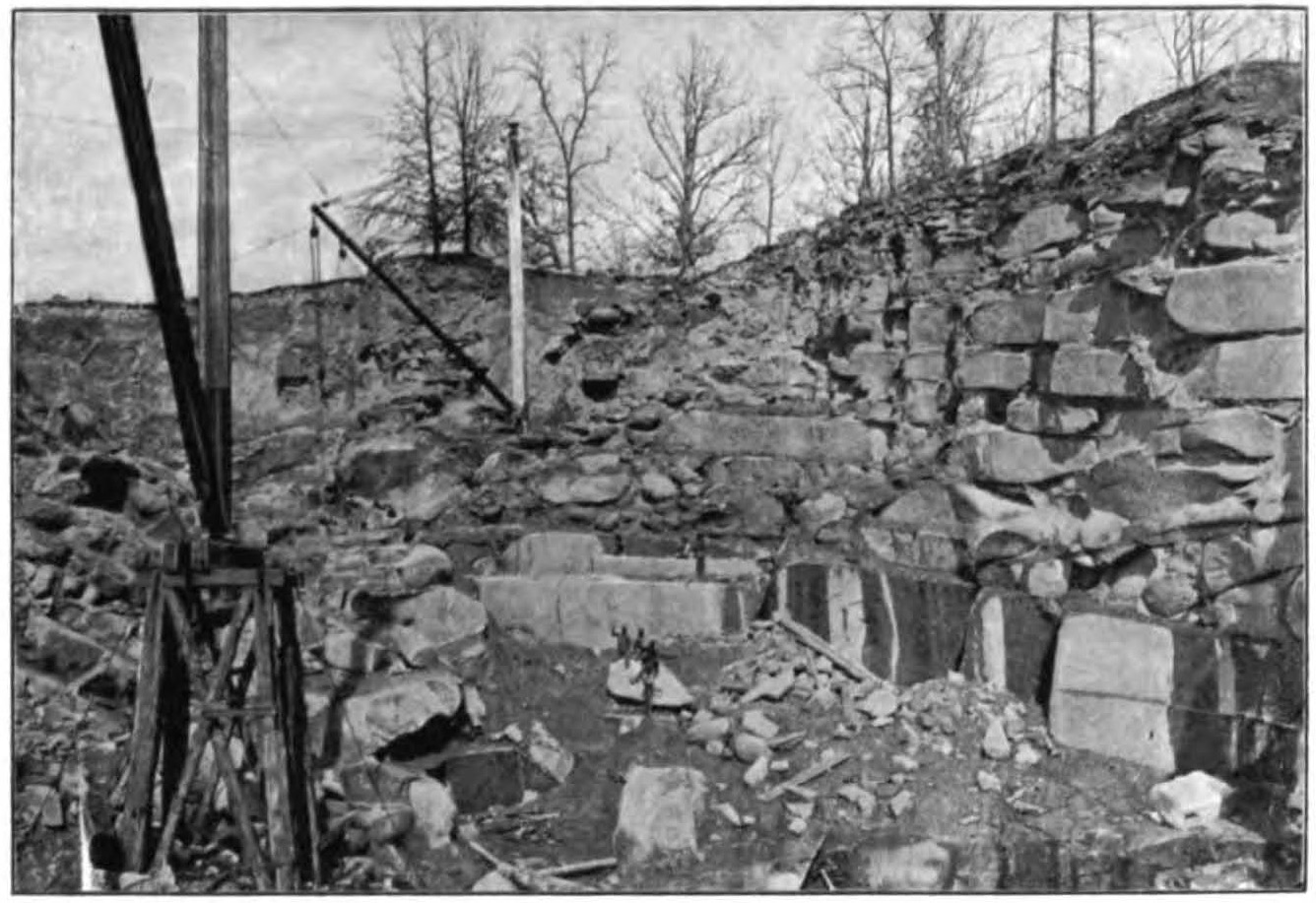
Middle Granite Quarry (Weller's Quarry) (c. 1898)

== Age ==
In 1966, G. W. Wetherill reported a radiometric date of the Woodstock Quartz Monzonite of 420 +/-50 Ma (Silurian). In 1998, A. A. Drake reported an age of 444 Ma (Ordovician), and suggested it may be comagmatic with the Guilford Quartz Monzonite.

== Use in construction ==
Woodstock granite can be found in the United States Capitol, Thomas Viaduct, "the Library of Congress, the inner walls of the Washington Monument, the Old Patent Office, and the Baltimore Custom House."

== See also ==
- Ellicott City Granodiorite
