= Oella Formation =

Cambrian schist in Maryland

- Stratigraphic range: Late Proterozoic or early Cambrian
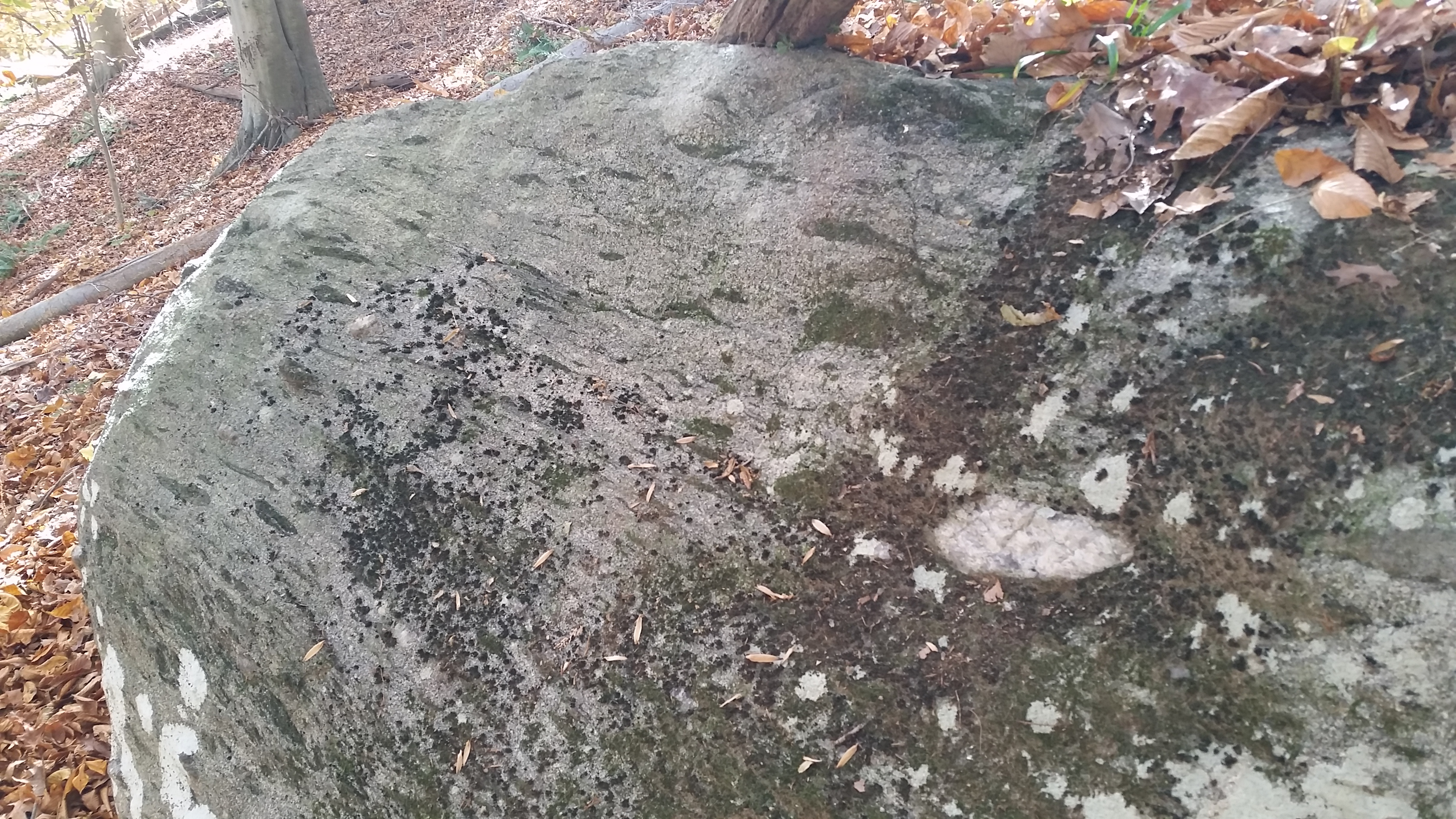
- Outcrop of Oella Formation located on hillside east of Governor Martin Court, Ellicott City
- Type: Metamorphic
- Unit of: Wissahickon Group
- Sub-units: Sweathouse Amphibolite Member
- Overlies: Loch Raven Schist

Lithology
- Primary: Schist and gneiss
- Other: Amphibolite

Location
- Region: Piedmont of Maryland
- Country: United States
- Extent: Howard and Baltimore Counties

Type section
- Named for: Oella, Maryland
- Named by: Willam P. Crowley, Juergen Reinhardt, and Emery T. Cleaves
- Year defined: 1976

The Oella Formation is a Late Proterozoic or early Cambrian schist in Howard and Baltimore Counties, Maryland. It is described as "Medium-grained biotite-plagioclase-muscovite-quartz schist, locally garnetiferous, interlayered on a centimeter to decimeter scale with fine-grained biotite-plagioclase-quartz gneiss, commonly bearing muscovite but less commonly garnet."

== Type locality ==
The type locality is along the Patapsco River at Oella, southwest Baltimore County.

== See also ==
- Ellicott City Granodiorite
