= Guilford Quartz Monzonite =

Quartz monzonite pluton in Howard County, Maryland

- Stratigraphic range: Devonian
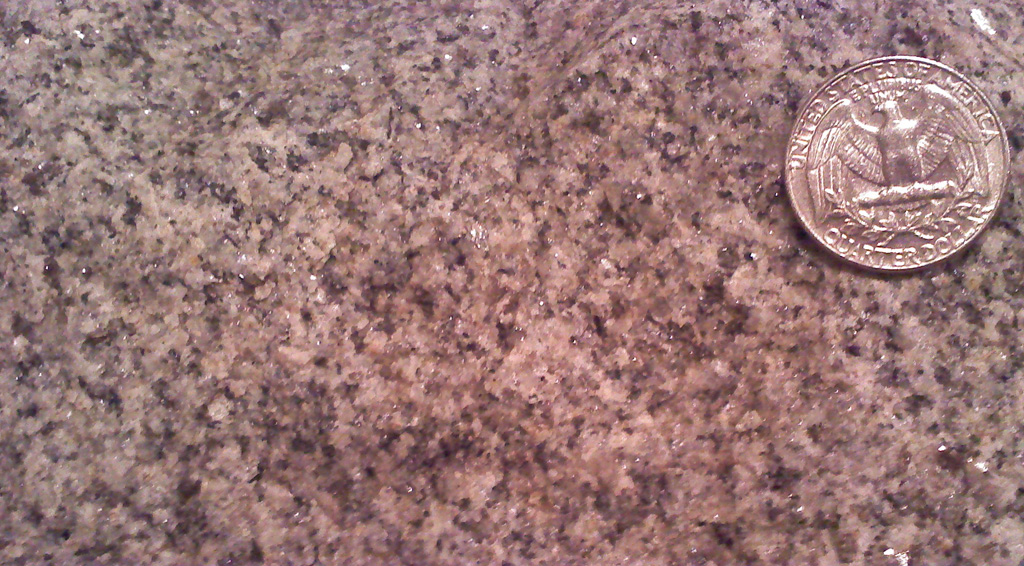
- Photographed on a boulder at the old Guilford Quarry on Guilford Road, Columbia, Maryland.
- Type: igneous

Lithology
- Primary: Monzonite

Location
- Region: Piedmont of Maryland
- Extent: central Maryland

Type section
- Named by: Cloos and Broedel, 1940

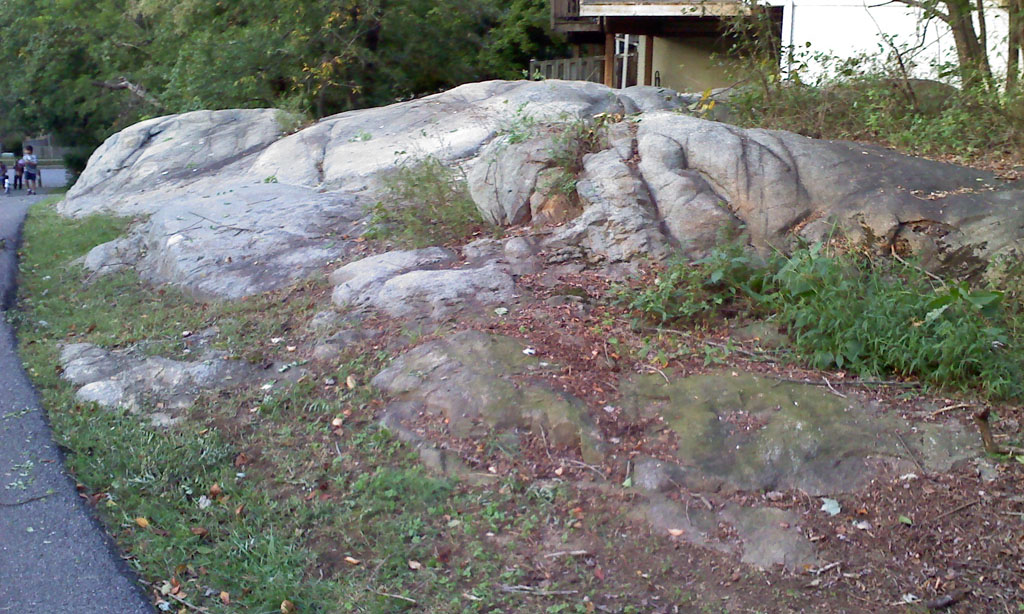
Outcrop of Guilford Quartz Monzonite in Kings Contrivance Village, Columbia, Maryland

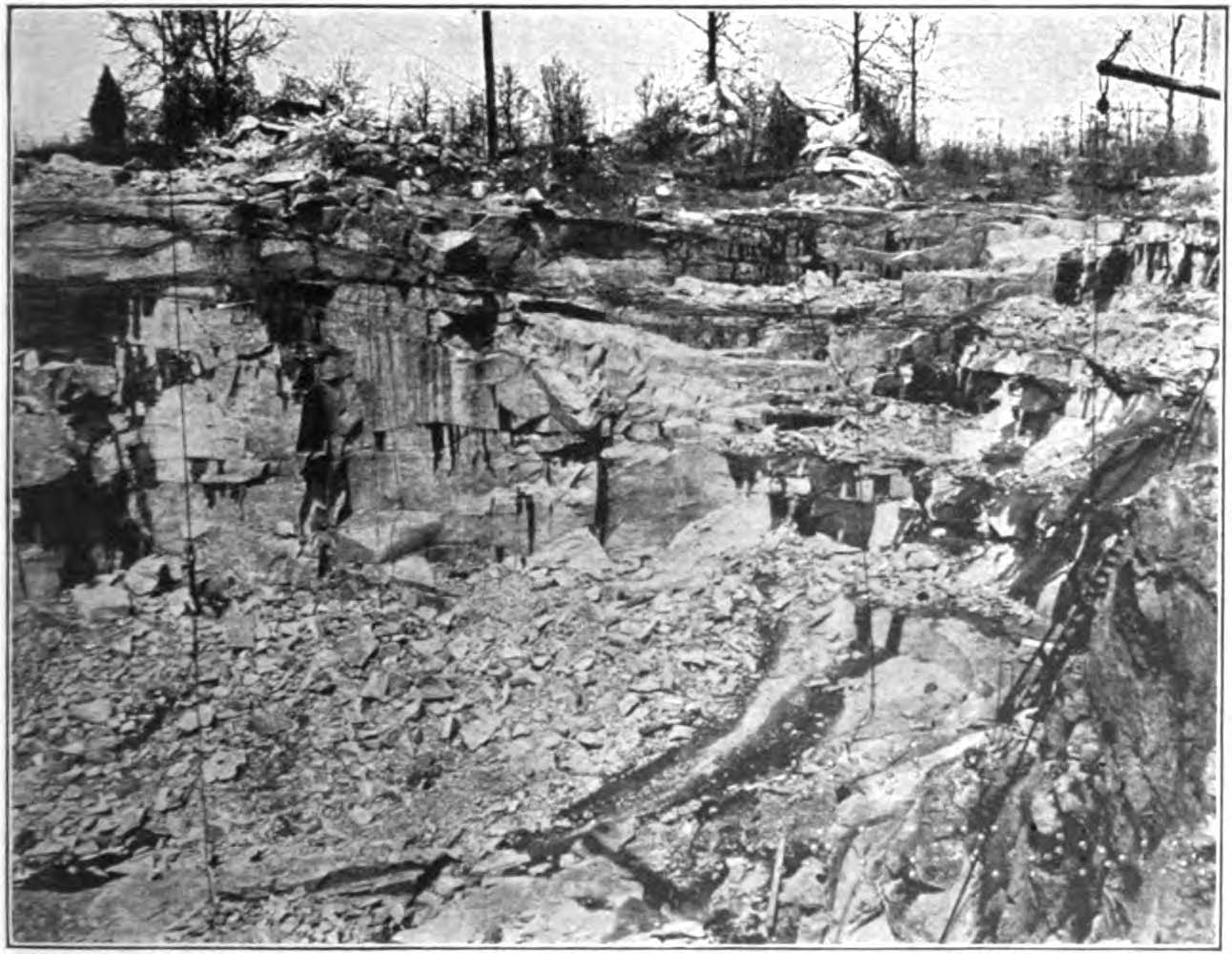
Historical photo c. 1910 of the Guilford Quarry while in operation

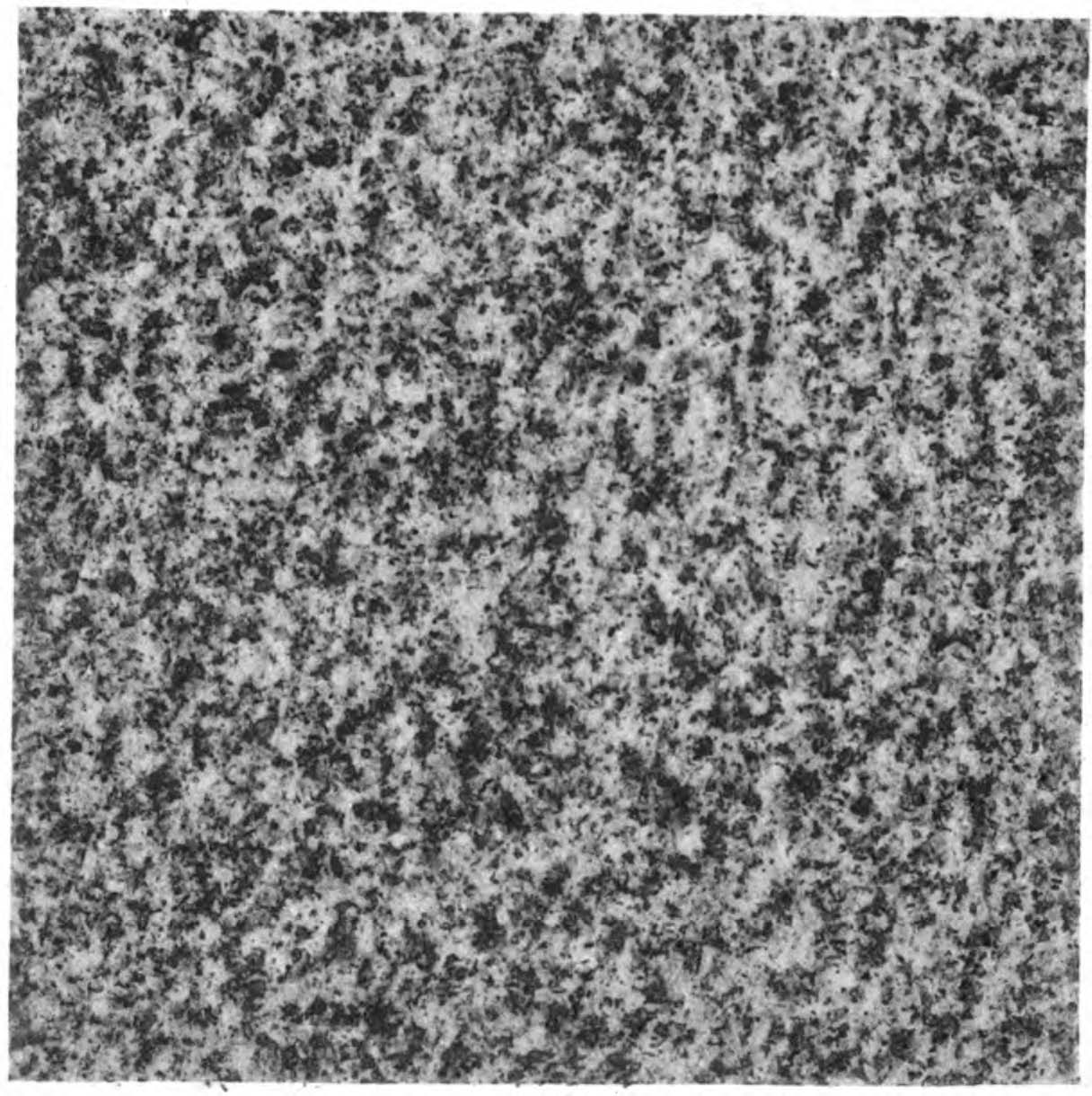
Polished slab from the Guilford Quarry (1898). Width is approximately 10.7 cm.

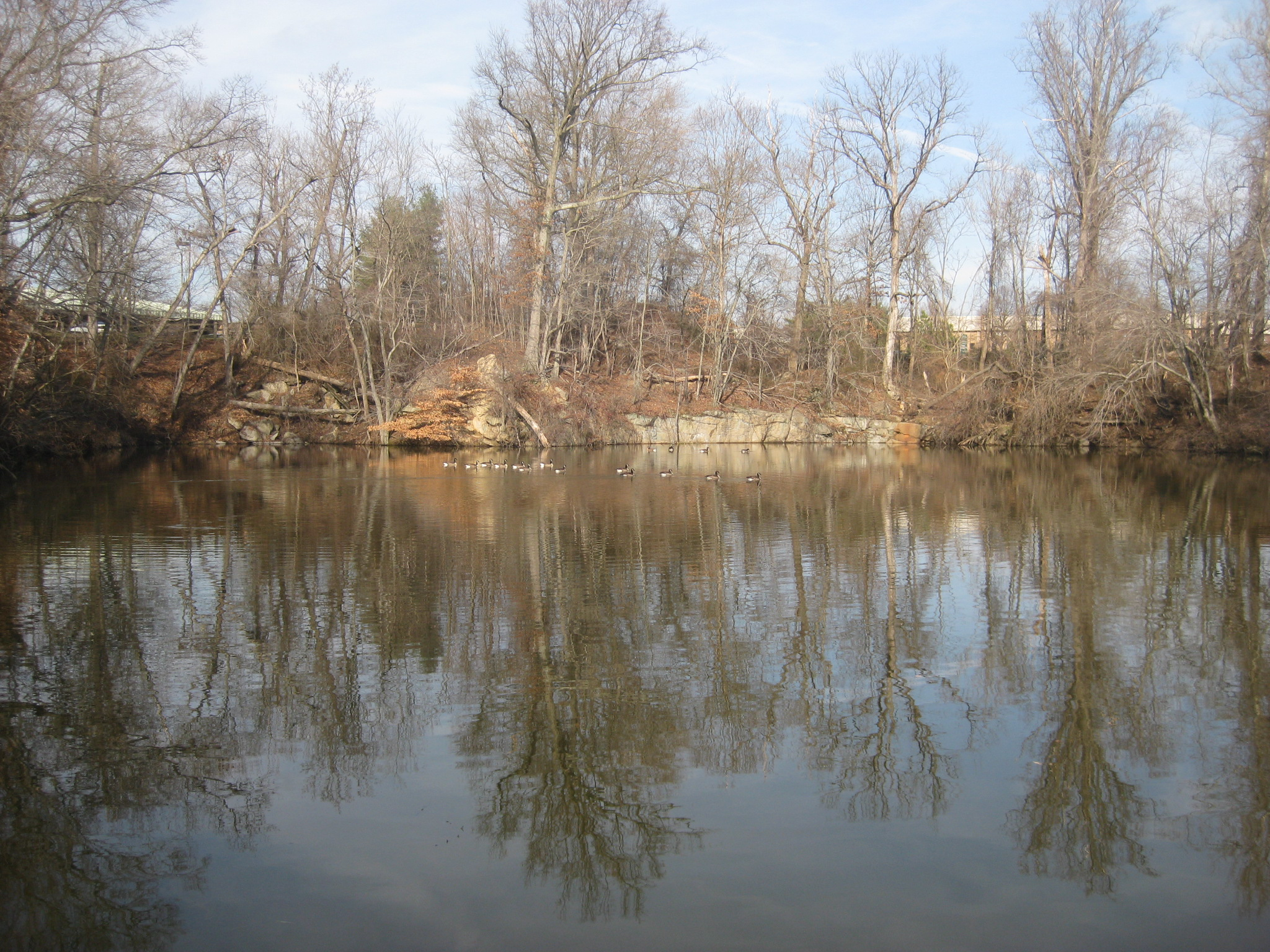
The old Guilford Quarry in January 2013, facing north.

The Guilford Quartz Monzonite is a Devonian quartz monzonite pluton in Howard County, Maryland. It is described as a biotite-muscovite-quartz monzonite which occurs as discontinuous lenticular bodies which intrude mainly through the Wissahickon Formation (gneiss).

The extent of this intrusion was originally mapped in 1940 as the "Guilford granite". It was given its current name in 1964 by C. A. Hopson. Hopson grouped the Guilford Quartz Monzonite with the Ellicott City Granodiorite and the Woodstock Quartz Monzonite as "Late-kinematic intrusive masses."

== Description ==
The Guilford Quartz Monzonite was described in 1898 as "perhaps the most attractive stone in the state" by Edward B. Mathews of the Maryland Geological Survey. He provides this detailed description of the granite:

The rock of this area differs from all of the other granites of the state in the persistent presence of both light and dark colored micas. Thus, according to the German classification, it is the only "true granite" in the state. Other granites may have muscovite as a constituent, but it is not so abundant or typical as in the present instance. Both of the micas are products of the original crystallization of the molten rock magma, and they are frequently in parallel growths. The biotite, which is especially rich in iron, possesses a very dark color, but shows no evident disintegration or decomposition. The feldspar is almost entirely microcline, which shows the cross-twinning very clearly, and appears clear and fresh with very few included flakes or small crystals. These microclines form the largest individual areas in the rock mass, sometimes reaching 0.15-0.2 of an inch (4-5 mm.) in diameter, while the clear transparent grains of quartz average less than 0.01 of an inch (.03 mm.). The individuals are interlocked in a mosaic, which indicates that the rock can well withstand any pressure to which it may normally be subjected. The mica flakes are small and evenly disseminated, so that they do not injure the polish which may be given to the rock in preparing it for monumental purposes.

Hopson reported the chemical composition (by %) of the Guilford Quartz Diorite from 1.5 miles west-southwest of Guilford along the Middle Patuxent River, as follows:

Chemical	%	Chemical	%
SiO_{2}	73.08	CaO	1.71
TiO_{2}	0.27	Na_{2}O	3.70
Al_{2}O_{3}	13.86	K_{2}O	4.09
Fe_{2}O_{3}	0.65	H_{2}O^{+}	0.46
FeO	1.40	H_{2}O^{−}	0.10
MnO	0.05	CO_{2}	0.05
MgO	0.48	P_{2}O_{5}	0.06

== Early quarrying ==
The 1898 account of Edward B. Mathews of the Maryland Geological Survey of the quarry at Guilford (now within the town of Columbia) is as follows:

The quarries at Guilford were originally opened about 1834, and were worked almost continuously from that date until the outbreak of the civil war in 1860. During the succeeding twenty-five years the operations were of little account, and little work was done until the Guilford and Waltersville Granite Company attempted to develop the industry in 1887. This effort lasted but a short time as all of the machinery was removed from the quarries in 1889. The industrial life of the district has been revived somewhat in recent years by the operations of Messrs. Matthew Gault and Sons, who commenced work in 1893, and by Messrs. Brunner and White, who opened a quarry of superior quality in March, 1895.

== Age ==
A. A. Drake argued that the Guilford is of Ordovician age because it is probably comagmatic with the Woodstock Quartz Monzonite dated at 444 Ma. An earlier source gives the date of 420 +/-50 Ma. More recently, radiometric dating (U-Pb SHRIMP) of zircon crystals extracted from the Guilford Quartz Monzonite yielded an age of 362 +/- 3 Ma (Devonian).
