= Edward Bennett Mathews =

American geologist (1869–1944)

- Born: August 13, 1869; Portland, Maine
- Died: February 4, 1944 (aged 74)
- Education: Colby College
- Scientific career
- Fields: Geology
- Workplaces: Johns Hopkins University, United States Geological Survey, Maryland Geological Survey

Edward Bennett Mathews, Ph.D. (August 13, 1869 – February 4, 1944) was an American geologist. He obtained a bachelor's degree from Colby College in 1891, and began serving with the United States Geological Survey in the same year, working under Charles R. Van Hise. He was a professor of Mineralogy and Petrography at Johns Hopkins University. He was appointed the Assistant State Geologist of Maryland in 1896 by the State Geologist, William Bullock Clark, and served in that role until 1917, when he became the State Geologist upon Clark's death. He retired from Johns Hopkins in 1939, departed the position of State Geologist in 1943, and died the following year. He is buried at the Oakwood Cemetery in Troy, New York.

== Publications ==
- Miller, B.L., Mathews, E.B., Bibbins, A.B., and Little, H.P., 1917, Tolchester folio, Maryland: U.S. Geological Survey, Geologic Atlas of the United States Folio GF-204, scale 1:125,000.
- Mathews, E.B., and Miller, W.J., 1905, Cockeysville Marble (Baltimore County, Maryland): Geological Society of America, Bulletin v.16, scale 1:158,000.
- Clark, W.B., Shattuck, G.B., Bascom, Florence, Mathews, E.B., Dorsey, C.W., Bonsteel, J.A., Fassig, O.L., Pressy, H.A., and Curran, H.M., 1902, The physical features of Cecil County (Maryland, accompanied by a County Atlas (1902)): Maryland Geological Survey
- Mathews, E.B., 1904, The structure of the Piedmont Plateau as shown in Maryland, American Journal of Science, 4th Series v. 17
- Mathews, E.B., Berry, E.W., Knopf, E.B., Jonas, A.I., Watson, E.B., Carter, W.T. Jr., Snyder, J.M., Bruce, O.C., Nunn, Roscoe, Bauer, L.A., and Besley, F.W., 1929, Baltimore County (Maryland): Maryland Geological Survey
- Mathews, E.B., Miller, B.L., Bennett, H.W., Tharp, W.E., Lyman, W.S., Westover, H.L., Nunn, Roscoe, Wood, B.D., Bauer, L.A., and Besley, F.W., 1926, The physical features of Queen Anne's County (Maryland, accompanied by a County Atlas (1916)): Maryland Geological Survey
- Mathews, E.B., Miller, B.L., Bennett, H.W., Tharp, W.E., Lyman, W.S., Westover, H.L., Nunn, Roscoe, Wood, B.D., Bauer, L.A., and Besley, F.W., 1926, The physical features of Talbot County (Maryland, accompanied by a County Atlas (1916)): Maryland Geological Survey
- Mathews, E.B., Miller, B.L., Bonsteel, J.A., Nunn, Roscoe, Grover, N.C., Bauer, L.A., and Besley, F.W., 1926, The physical features of Kent County (Maryland, accompanied by a County Atlas (1915)): Maryland Geological Survey
