= Monzonite =

Igneous intrusive rock with low quartz and equal plagioclase and alkali feldspar

- Igneous rock
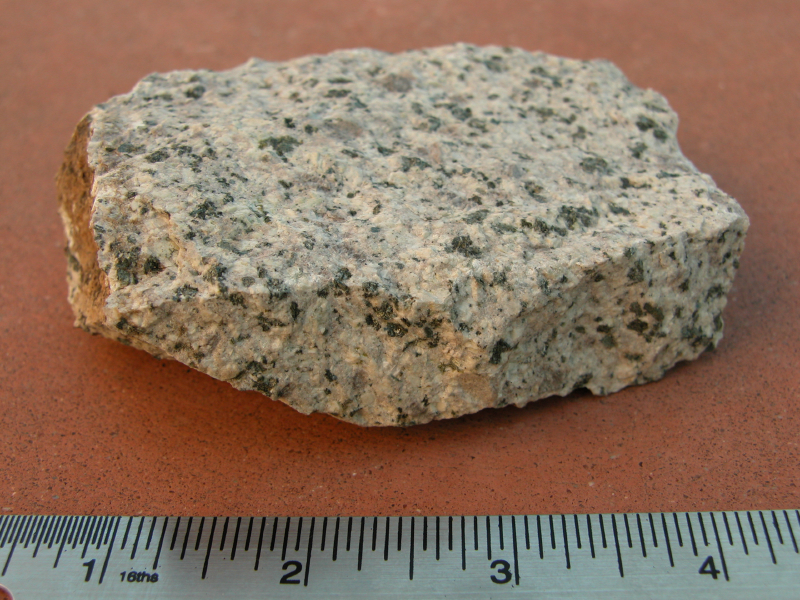
- Monzonite specimen from Rock Library (NASA JPL)

Composition
- Mostly plagioclase and alkali feldspar

Monzonite is an igneous intrusive rock, formed by slow cooling of underground magma that has a moderate silica content and is enriched in alkali metal oxides. Monzonite is composed mostly of plagioclase and alkali feldspar.

Syenodiorite is an obsolescent term for monzonite or for monzodiorite. Larvikite is a particular form of monzonite.

== Description ==
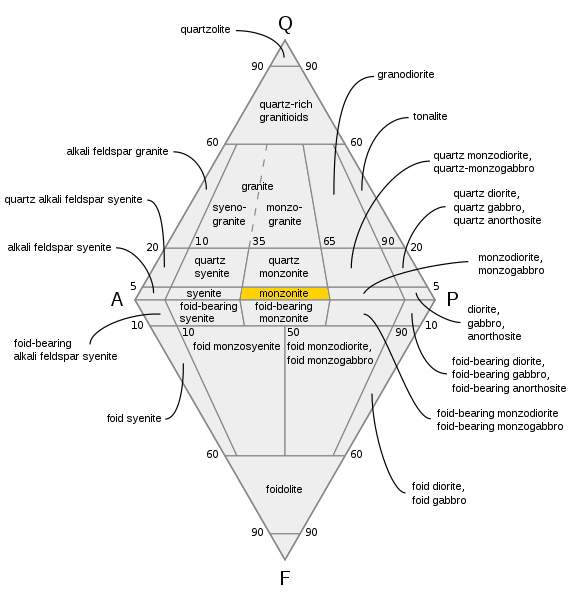
QAPF diagram for classification of intrusive igneous rocks, with the monzonite field highlighted

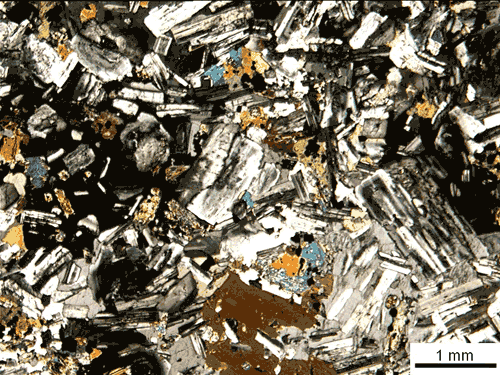
Photomicrograph of thin section of monzonite (in cross polarised light)

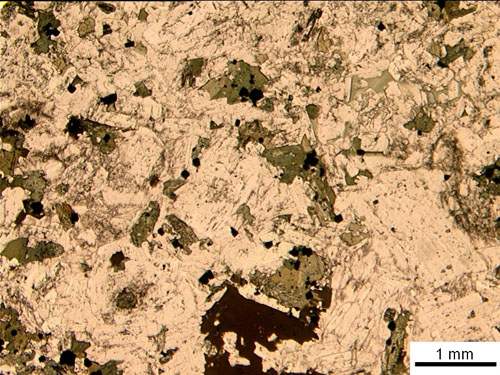
Photomicrograph of thin section of monzonite (in plane polarised light)

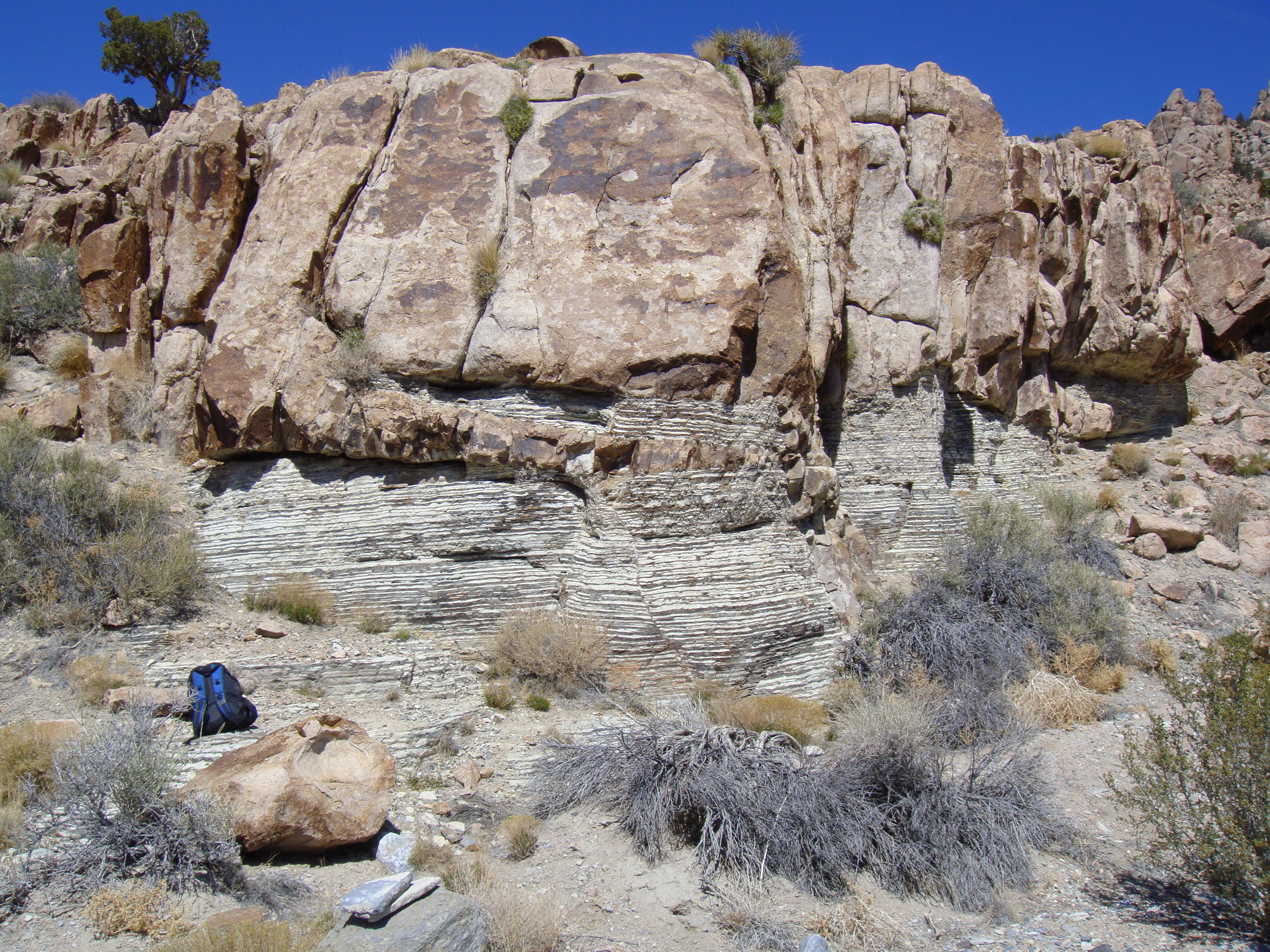
The Notch Peak monzonite intrusion in Utah inter-fingers (partly as a dike) with highly metamorphosed Cambrian carbonate host rocks

Monzonite is a coarse-grained (phaneritic) igneous rock. Such rocks are classified by their relative percentages of quartz, plagioclase, alkali feldspar, and feldspathoid (the QAPF classification). Monzonite is defined as rock having less than 5% quartz in its QAPF fraction and in which alkali feldspar makes up between 35% and 65% of the total feldspar content. If quartz constitutes greater than 5% of the QAPF fraction, the rock is termed a quartz monzonite, while if feldspathoids are present as up to 10% of the QAPF fraction, the rock is termed a feldspathoid-bearing monzonite. Rock richer in alkali feldspar is classified as syenite, while rock richer in plagioclase is termed a monzodiorite. The volcanic equivalent of monzonite is latite.

The plagioclase in monzonite is sodium-rich, ranging from oligoclase to andesine, and is moderately well shaped (subhedral to euhedral). The alkali feldspar is typically orthoclase. Monzonite may also contain minor amounts of hornblende, biotite and other minerals.

== Occurrence ==
Monzonite is found in association with gabbro and granodiorite in the Khankandi pluton in the Alborz Mountains of Iran. The monzonite likely formed during the collision that closed the Tethys Ocean, from partial melting of upper mantle that had previously been altered by fluids released from a subducting ocean crust slab. Monzonite can also form in extensional crustal settings or by partial melting of lower crust of alkali basalt composition.

Diorite, monzonite, and syenite are found together on the margins of the Paleoproterozoic North China craton. These likely formed during the assembly of Columbia and suggest the North China craton was in the interior of Columbia, between Laurentia and Siberia.

The Bingham mine consists of porphyry copper deposits hosted in altered monzonite. Alteration has converted some of the monzonite to compositions resembling quartz monzonite or granite, by altering plagioclase to potassium feldspar and emplacing hydrothermal quartz.

Fragments of monzonite have been found on the surface of the Moon. These likely formed as a mixture of immiscible granite liquid with cumulates composed of plagioclase and pyroxene, which supports the theory that lunar granites form through silicate liquid immiscibility. This is a process in which high-silica and low-silica components of a magma separate like oil and vinegar.

== Etymology ==
Monzonite was originally named after the Monzoni range in Val di Fassa (Trento Province, Italy) where it is abundant. As rock definitions have been systematized and codified, this association has lost any relevance to the rock's definition.
