= Gabbro (disambiguation) =

Gabbro is a type of intrusive igneous rock.

Gabbro may also refer to:

== Places ==
=== Italy ===
- Gabbro, Rosignano Marittimo, a village in Tuscany; the namesake of gabbro rock

=== Antarctica ===
- Gabbro Crest
- Gabbro Hills

== Geology ==
=== Rocks ===
- Hornblende gabbro, a type of intrusive rock
- Nepheline-bearing gabbro, a type of intrusive igneous rock
- Quartz gabbro, a type of intrusive rock

=== Formations ===
==== Canada ====
- Swift Current Gabbro, a geological formation in Newfoundland

==== United States ====
- Baltimore Gabbro Complex, a geological formation in Maryland
- Concord Gabbro-Syenite Complex, a geological formation in North Carolina
- Duluth Gabbro, a geological formation in Minnesota
- Farmington Gabbro, a geological formation in North Carolina
- Gabbro Peak, a summit of the Sierra Nevada in California
- Roosevelt Gabbros, a geological formation in Oklahoma
