= Southern Oklahoma Aulacogen =

Failed rift of tectonic plates in the southern US

- Stratigraphic range: Early to mid Cambrian
- An outline of the Aulacogen
- Area: Approximately 42,500 mi^{2} (110,000 km^{2})

Location
- Coordinates: 35°N 99.3°W.
- Country: United States

The Southern Oklahoma Aulacogen (ah-lah-coh-jin) is a failed rift, or failed rift arm (aulacogen), of the triple junction that became the Iapetus Ocean spreading ridges. It is a significant geological feature in the Western and Southern United States. It formed sometime in the early to mid Cambrian Period and spans the Wichita Mountains, Taovayan Valley, Anadarko Basin, and Hardeman Basin in Southwestern Oklahoma. The Southern Oklahoma Aulacogen is primarily composed of basaltic dikes, gabbros, and units of granitic rock.

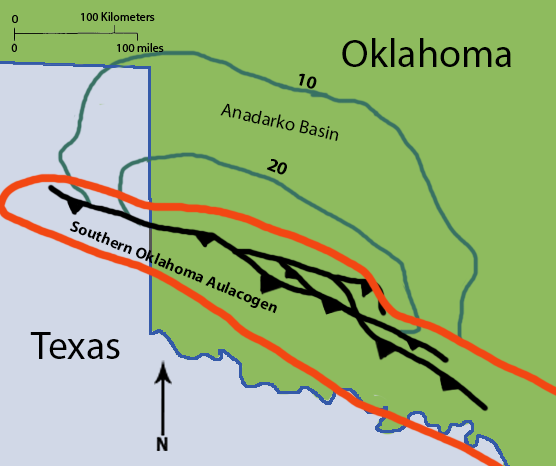
A rough outline of the inferred bounds of the Southern Oklahoma Aulacogen

== Description ==
The Southern Oklahoma Aulacogen extends roughly 500 miles long (805 km) by ~80–90 miles wide (129–145 km). The two remaining continental plate boundary arms of the triple junction from which the Southern Oklahoma aulacogen formed became spreading zones for the spreading of the Iapetus Ocean during the breakup of the supercontinent, Rodinia, estimated to have occurred in the Cryogenian Period, approximately 750 million years ago. These arms closed in the Pennsylvanian Period (~323.2–298.9 Ma) and formed part of the Ouachita orogenic belt. The Southern Oklahoma Aulacogen is estimated to contain over 250,000 km^{3} of igneous rock. The aulacogen is inverted: rather than extending across the surface it penetrates into the North American craton, and is aligned with the northern edge of a deeply buried Proterozoic basin of uncertain origin which may have formed through igneous layering or deposition. The aulacogen terminates on contact with the Ouachita orogenic belt. The Southern Oklahoma Aulacogen is associated with a widespread anomalous area in which seismic waves travel more slowly. A common comparison is drawn from this aulacogen to the Dniepr-Donets Aulacogen in Baltica because both are significant intracratonic rifts.

The Southern Oklahoma Aulacogen contains numerous igneous rocks. Among these rocks are a multitude of gabbros, including anorthosite, titanium-rich, iron-rich, phosphorus-rich, and biotite gabbros. Also included are rhyolites and granites. This assemblage is very similar to the mid-Proterozoic age anorthosite-mangerite-charnockite-granite (AMCG) complexes of North America, but for the lack of coarse massif anorthosites. This is significant in that AMCG complexes tend to form at huge depths in the Earth's crust and thus cool more slowly, allowing the massif anorthosites to form coarse-grained. The similar igneous assemblage suggests that the magmas that formed the igneous rocks of the Southern Oklahoma Aulacogen quickly cooled to at or near their crystallization point, much more quickly than the magmas of AMCG complexes, thus resulting in finer-grained anorthosites.

More recently, different interpretations of seismic and outcrop data, as well as stratigraphy in the area have led some studies to postulate that this formation may not be an aulacogen after all, but a system of transform faults.

== Tectonic evolution ==
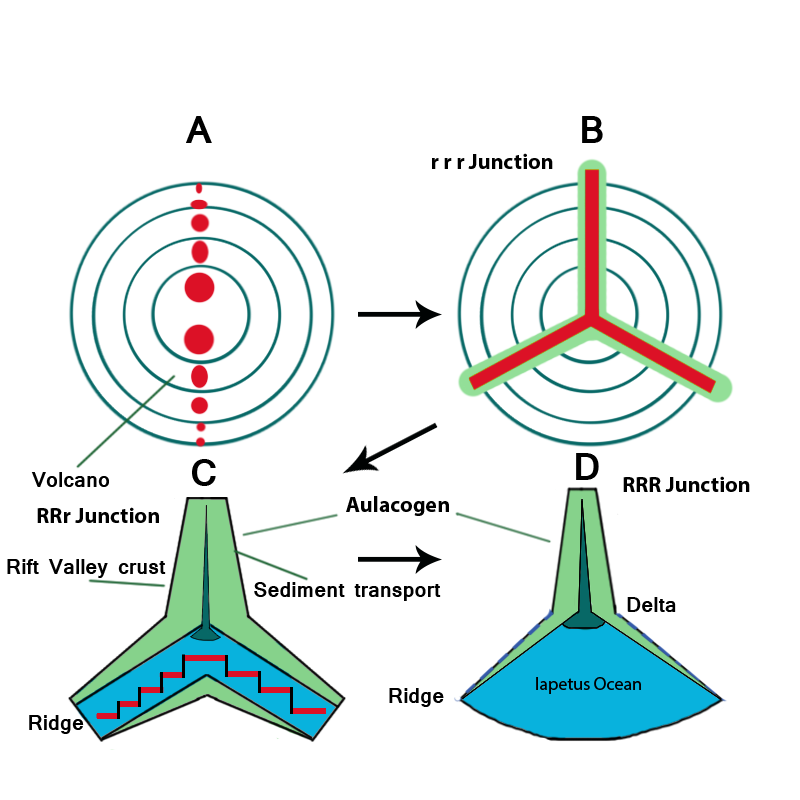
An illustration of the likely formation history of the Southern Oklahoma Aulacogen. In A, volcanoes form along a continental plate boundary. B shows the triple junction's basic appearance following its formation. C shows that one of the three "arms" has not split while the other two do, continuing into D, in which the Iapetus Ocean forms.

The Southern Oklahoma Aulacogen formed sometime in the Late Proterozoic Eon, between 525 and 550 million years ago, during the rifting of the Laurentia supercontinent or North American Craton, the geological core of North America. Its formation and bimodal igneous activity occurred simultaneously, with two definite episodes of magma activity, mafic and felsic, the former of which being chiefly composed of gabbro-heavy magma and the latter phase being primarily composed of rhyolitic magma. It is hypothesized that between the mafic and felsic stages of magmatic activity substantial uplift occurred, which correlates to the lack of coarse-grained massif anorthosites presented previously. The remaining two arms of its original triple-junction became spreading zones for the nascent Iapetus Ocean. The aulacogen penetrated the craton, causing normal faults to form in what became the Anadarko Basin.

The aulacogen underwent crustal shortening and inversion sometime in the Mississippian Period to the Early Permian Period, roughly 330–280 million years ago. This coincides with the closing of the Iapetus spreading zones and the overthrusting of the Ouachita uplift over the Anadarko Basin, forming the Wichita Mountains. This also resulted in the reactivation of Cambrian rift faults, often becoming reverse or listric thrust faults. Anticlines formed in the sedimentary rock layers of the basin, contributing to the formation of the deep hydrocarbon reservoir of the Anadarko Basin. The formation of these listric faults and anticlines indicates that the crustal shortening was significant, up to 10–15 km or more.

The igneous rocks found in the aulacogen were also uplifted during the Ouachita uplift and subsequently reburied by both local and transported sediments. As there was no major deformation of the midsection of North America during the Mesozoic and Cenozoic eras, the aulacogen's structure and rift assembly were mostly preserved. Erosion in recent eras has eroded sediments overlying a section of plutonic and volcanic rocks that once formed the bedrock of the aulacogen, and as a result this aulacogen is "one of the best preserved and best exposed" selections of the igneous results of ancient rift activity. Consequently, the Southern Oklahoma Aulacogen is the designated type in the United States.

== Mafic rocks ==
The mafic rocks of the Southern Oklahoma aulacogen can be separated into two primary groups, the Raggedy Mountain Gabbros and the Late Diabase Dikes. The Raggedy Mountain Gabbros can be further separated into two subgroups due to petrographic analysis and field mapping. These subgroups are the Glen Mountains Layered Complex and the Roosevelt Gabbros.

- The Glen Mountains Layered Complex (GMLC), thought to be the oldest surface unit of the aulacogen, covers roughly 2000 square kilometers and has several major units, including plagioclase cumulate, plagioclase-olivine-pyroxene, and plagioclase-pyroxene overlying a layer of plagioclase-olivine cumulate. These rocks have been described as tholeiitic. The plagioclase crystals found in this area contain a proportion of anorthite much higher than the average content for massif-type anorthosites. On average, plagioclase ranges from An_{40} to An_{65} in massif-type anorthosites. In the plagioclase crystals from the GMLC, the anorthite content is, on average, An_{70} and ranges from An_{57} to An_{80}. The rocks from this area generally have much more aluminium oxide and calcium oxide, and less silicon dioxide and sodium oxide than average massifs, which is related to the anorthosite content. Large clinopyroxene crystals (10s of centimeters) are found in this area, as well as in both cumulate and intercumulate phases, though intercumulate clinopyroxene is more rare. The Roosevelt Gabbros are a small sequence of biotite-bearing, hydrous gabbro plutons and dikes that intrude on the Glen Mountains Layered Complex. These plutons contain various distinct layers, such as iron-rich, biotite-hornblende-quartz diorites, tonalite layers, and olivine gabbro layers. Pegmatites displaying deuteric alteration are also present. These characteristics are congruous with shallow, hydrous gabbroic magma. However, this is at odds with the Glen Mountains Layered Complex, and thus it is hypothesized that the two subgroups formed from separate magmatic bodies, one of which being anhydrous and the other of which being hydrous.
- The Late Diabase Dikes are fine-grained, porphyritic basaltic dikes that cross-cut the area of the Southern Oklahoma aulacogen. Because dikes so commonly intrude nearly all igneous rock types, they are generally accepted to be associated with the final phase of igneous activity in an area, particularly a rift. However, the unique structure of the Late Diabase Dikes suggest that their intrusion occurred simultaneously with the entire rifting period. The dikes' structure is unique in that partially melted deposit of Mount Scott granite is intruded next to one of the dikes, indicating a high ambient temperature during its intrusion, indicating that the diabase dike's intrusion occurred nearly immediately following the intrusion of the Mount Scott Granite. This, along with fragments of diabase dikes found within other local granite units, seems to be consistent with the hypothesis of simultaneous dike intrusion. The dikes can be classified into three groups due to their mineral assemblages. These groups are microdiorite, microgabbro, and late diabase. Microdiorite dikes are generally composed of amphibole and sodic plagioclase. Microgabbro dikes are mostly composed of olivine and biotite. Late Diabase dikes contain augite and calcic plagioclase.

== Felsic rocks ==
The felsic rocks of the Southern Oklahoma aulacogen are broken into two main units, the Carlton Rhyolite Group and the Wichita Granite Group. There is a distinct change in texture in the layers of granite, with earlier deposited layers being very fine-grained in comparison to later, coarse-grained granite layers.

- The Carlton Rhyolite Group is a very thick sequence of subaerial flows, tuffs, basalt flows, and agglomerates, exposed on the surface as tabular layers ranging in thickness from 80 to 400 meters. However, the Carlton Rhyolite has formed into exceptionally thick sequences of these tabular layers, sometimes as thick as two kilometers. There are limited outcrops of the Carlton rhyolites in the area, but it is fairly expansive under the surface. Using U-Pb dating, the age of the Carlton Rhyolite has been established to be around 500 to 550 million years old. Zircon geothermometric analysis suggests that the Carlton Rhyolite crystallized at a temperature of around 950 °C. The Carlton Rhyolite Group also contains high-temperature variations of vug-quartz such as β-cristobalite. This suggests that the parent magma of the Carlton Rhyolite was a high-temperature felsic lava. The Carlton Rhyolite contains relatively large crystals of various felsic minerals, such as plagioclase, quartz, and alkali feldspar, though it also contains limited amounts of mafic minerals like pyroxene.
- The Wichita Granite Group is a section of extensive granitic sheets, the longest of which extends for over 55 km but is only .5 km thick. The Wichita Granite Group is arranged along the group's contacts with other rock groups in the area, specifically the GMLC and the Carlton Rhyolite Group. This sequence of granite has unique contacts with these two groups. It cross-cuts the Carlton Rhyolite group and has intrusive dikes that intrude on the Glen Mountains Layered Complex, and may partially merge with layers in the Raggedy Mountain Gabbro group, as hybrid mafic and felsic rocks have been found near the contact between them. In general, the Wichita Granite Group is composed of medium- to fine-grained alkali feldspar, though some units of coarse-grained granites occur.

Some thought has been put forward as to the corresponding mafic intrusion needed to produce these felsic rocks, either through partial melting of the adjacent crust or through fractional crystallization of the mafic magma itself. Gilbert (1982) suggests that an igneous body related to the Late Diabase Dikes may be responsible, despite the geochemical differences between the "wet" dikes and "dry" felsic rocks. Gilbert also points out that the predicted existence of a felsic-precursor mafic magma precludes the assumption that the positive Bouguer gravity anomaly is due only to the mafic rocks currently observed in the aulacogen.

== Significance to petroleum exploration ==
Due to its unique structure and faulting, the area within and around the aulacogen developed very deep basins (such as the Anadarko Basin), forming excellent petroleum sources. Igneous rock deposits often form the hanging walls of anticline reverse faults in this area, leading to an unusual number of petroleum wells drilled into them in order to access the petroleum-bearing rock layers below. A graph of the geothermal history of the Southern Oklahoma Aulacogen suggests that sections of rock in the area may have been, at one point, in the temperature range of the "liquid window," the range of temperatures that are ideal for oil formation. The isotherms of this window range from 65 °C to 150 °C. This further suggests that the area may have served as an oil formation bed before a late Ordovician fluid migration pulse.
