= Monzogabbro =

Type of intrusive igneous rock

Monzogabbro is an intrusive rock with a composition intermediate between gabbro and monzonite. It is defined in the QAPF classification as coarse-grained igneous rock in which quartz makes up 0% to 5% of the QAPF mineral fraction, plagioclase makes up 65% to 90% of the total feldspar content, and the plagioclase is calcium-rich (%An > 50).
