= Tectonic subsidence =

Sinking of the Earth's crust on a large scale

Tectonic subsidence is the sinking of the Earth's crust on a large scale, relative to crustal-scale features or the geoid. The movement of crustal plates and accommodation spaces produced by faulting brought about subsidence on a large scale in a variety of environments, including passive margins, aulacogens, fore-arc basins, foreland basins, intercontinental basins and pull-apart basins. Three mechanisms are common in the tectonic environments in which subsidence occurs: extension, cooling and loading.

== Mechanisms ==
=== Extension ===
Normal faults extending crust through horst and graben systems

Where the lithosphere undergoes horizontal extension at a normal fault or rifting center, the crust will stretch until faulting occurs, either by a system of normal faults (which creates horsts and grabens) or by a system of listric faults. These fault systems allow the region to stretch, while also decreasing its thickness. A thinner crust subsides relative to thicker, undeformed crust.

=== Cooling ===
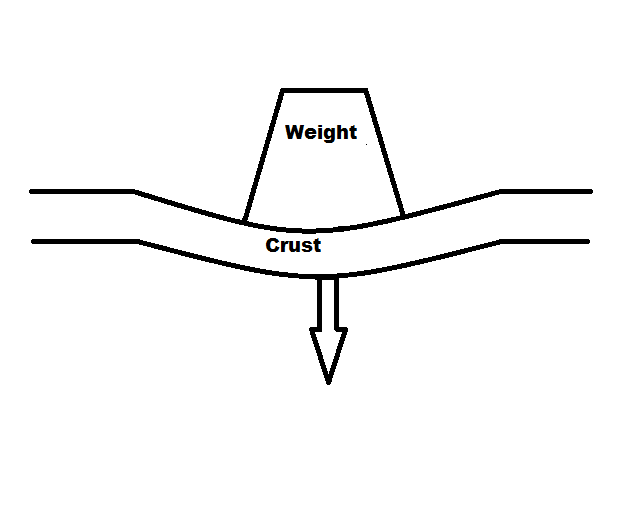
Weight causes crustal flexure and subsidence

Lithospheric stretching/thinning during rifting results in regional necking of the lithosphere (the elevation of the upper surface decreases while the lower boundary rises). The underlying asthenosphere passively rises to replace the thinned mantle lithosphere. Subsequently, after the rifting/stretching period ends, this shallow asthenosphere gradually cools back into mantle lithosphere over a period of many tens of millions of years. Because mantle lithosphere is denser than asthenospheric mantle, this cooling causes subsidence. This gradual subsidence due to cooling is known as "thermal subsidence".

=== Loading ===
The adding of weight by sedimentation from erosion or orogenic processes, or loading, causes crustal depression and subsidence. Sediments accumulate at the lowest elevation possible, in accommodation spaces. The rate and magnitude of sedimentation controls the rate at which subsidence occurs. By contrast, in orogenic processes, mountain building creates a large load on the Earth's crust, causing flexural depressions in adjacent lithospheric crust.

== Environments ==
=== Tectonically inactive ===
These settings are not tectonically active, but still experience large-scale subsidence because of tectonic features of the crust.

==== Intracontinental basins ====
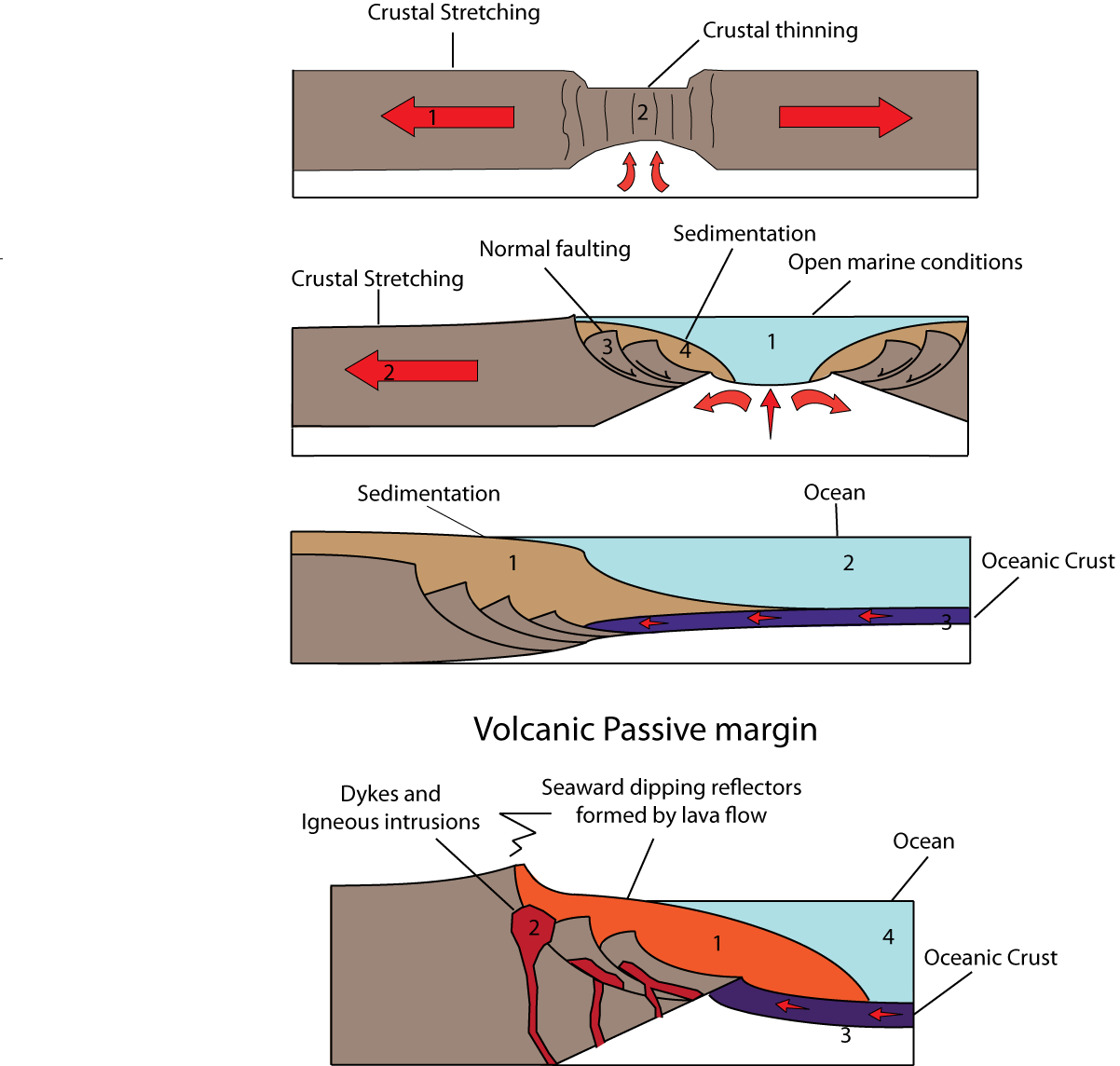
Formation of passive margin

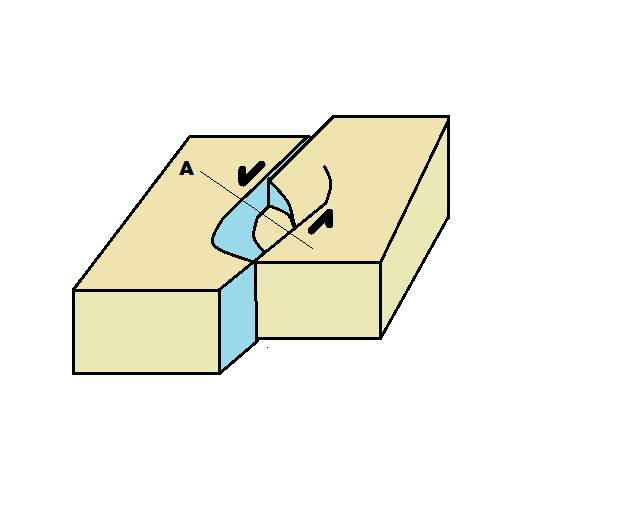
Pull-apart basin created by strike-slip faults

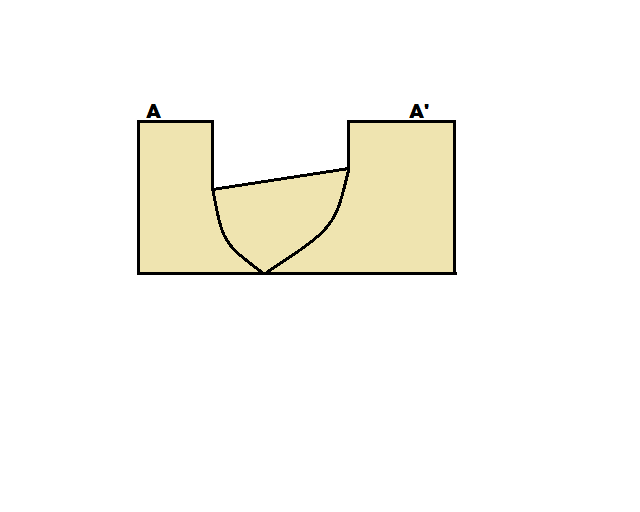
Cross section of a pull-apart basin

Intracontinental basins are large areal depressions that are tectonically inactive and not near any plate boundaries. Multiple hypotheses have been introduced to explain this slow, long-lived subsidence: long-term cooling since the breakup of Pangea, interaction of deformation around the edge of the basin and deep earth dynamics. The Illinois basin and Michigan basin are examples of intracontinental basins. Extensive swamps are sometimes formed along the shorelines of these basins, leading to the burial of plant matter that later forms coal.

=== Extensional ===
Tectonic subsidence can occur in these environments as the crust thinning.

==== Passive margins ====
Successful rifting forms a spreading center like a mid-ocean ridge, which moves progressively further from coastlines as oceanic lithosphere is produced. Due to this initial phase of rifting, the crust in a passive margin is thinner than adjacent crust and subsides to create an accommodation space. Accumulation of non-marine sediment forms alluvial fans in the accommodation space. As rifting proceeds, listric fault systems form and further subsidence occurs, resulting in the creation of an ocean basin. After the cessation of rifting, cooling causes the crust to further subside, and loading with sediment will cause further tectonic subsidence.

==== Aulacogens ====
Aulacogens occur at failed rifts, where continental crust does not completely split. Similar to the lithospheric heating that occurs during the formation of passive margins, subsidence occurs due to heated lithosphere sagging as spreading occurs. Once tensional forces cease, subsidence continues due to cooling.

=== Collisional ===
Tectonic subsidence can occur in these settings as the plates collide against or under each other.

==== Pull-apart basins ====
Pull-apart basins have short-lived subsidence that forms from transtensional strike-slip faults. Moderate strike-slip faults create extensional releasing bends and opposing walls pull apart from each other. Normal faults occur, inducing small scale subsidence in the area, which ceases once the fault stops propagating. Cooling occurs after the fault fails to propagate further following the crustal thinning via normal faulting.

==== Forearc basins ====
Volcanic arc system

Forearc basins form in subduction zones as sedimentary material is scraped off the subducting oceanic plate, forming an accretionary prism between the subducting oceanic lithosphere and the overriding continental plate. Between this wedge and the associated volcanic arc is a zone of depression in the sea floor. Extensional faulting due to relative motion between the accretionary prism and the volcanic arc may occur. Abnormal cooling effects due to the cold, water-laden downgoing plate as well as crustal thinning due to underplating may also be at work.

==== Foreland basins ====
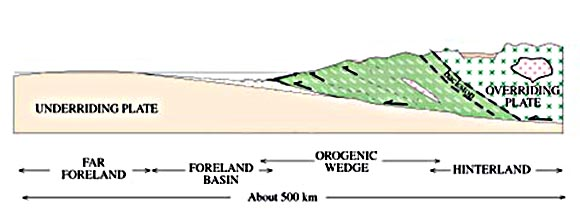

Foreland basins are flexural depressions created by large fold thrust sheets that form toward the undeformed continental crust. They form as an isostatic response to an orogenic load. Basin growth is controlled by load migration and corresponding sedimentation rates. The broader a basin is, the greater the subsidence is in magnitude. Subsidence is increased in the adjacent basin as the load migrates further into the foreland, causing subsidence. Sediment eroded from the fold thrust is deposited in the basin, with thickening layers toward the thrust belt and thinning layers away from the thrust belt; this feature is called differential subsidence.
