= Quartz monzogabbro =

Quartz monzogabbro is an intrusive rock intermediate between quartz gabbro and quartz monzonite. Under the QAPF classification, it is an intrusive rock in which quartz makes up 5% to 20% of the QAPF mineral fraction, plagioclase makes up 65% to 90% of the total feldspar content, and the plagioclase is calcium-rich (%An > 50).
