= Roosevelt Gabbros =

- Stratigraphic range: Cambrian, ~532 Ma
- Type: Geological formation
- Unit of: Raggedy Mountain Gabbro Group
- Sub-units: Glen Creek Gabbro, Sandy Creek Gabbro, Mount Sheridan Gabbro
- Underlies: Mount Scott Granite
- Overlies: Glen Mountain Layered Complex

Lithology
- Primary: Biotite gabbro

Location
- Region: Cambrian Wichita Igneous Province of Southwestern Oklahoma
- Country: United States

Type section
- Named for: Roosevelt, Oklahoma
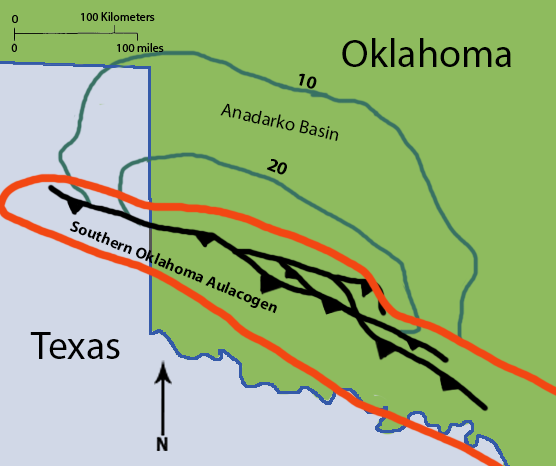
- Range of the Southern Oklahoma Aulacogen, where the Roosevelt Gabbros intrude throughout.

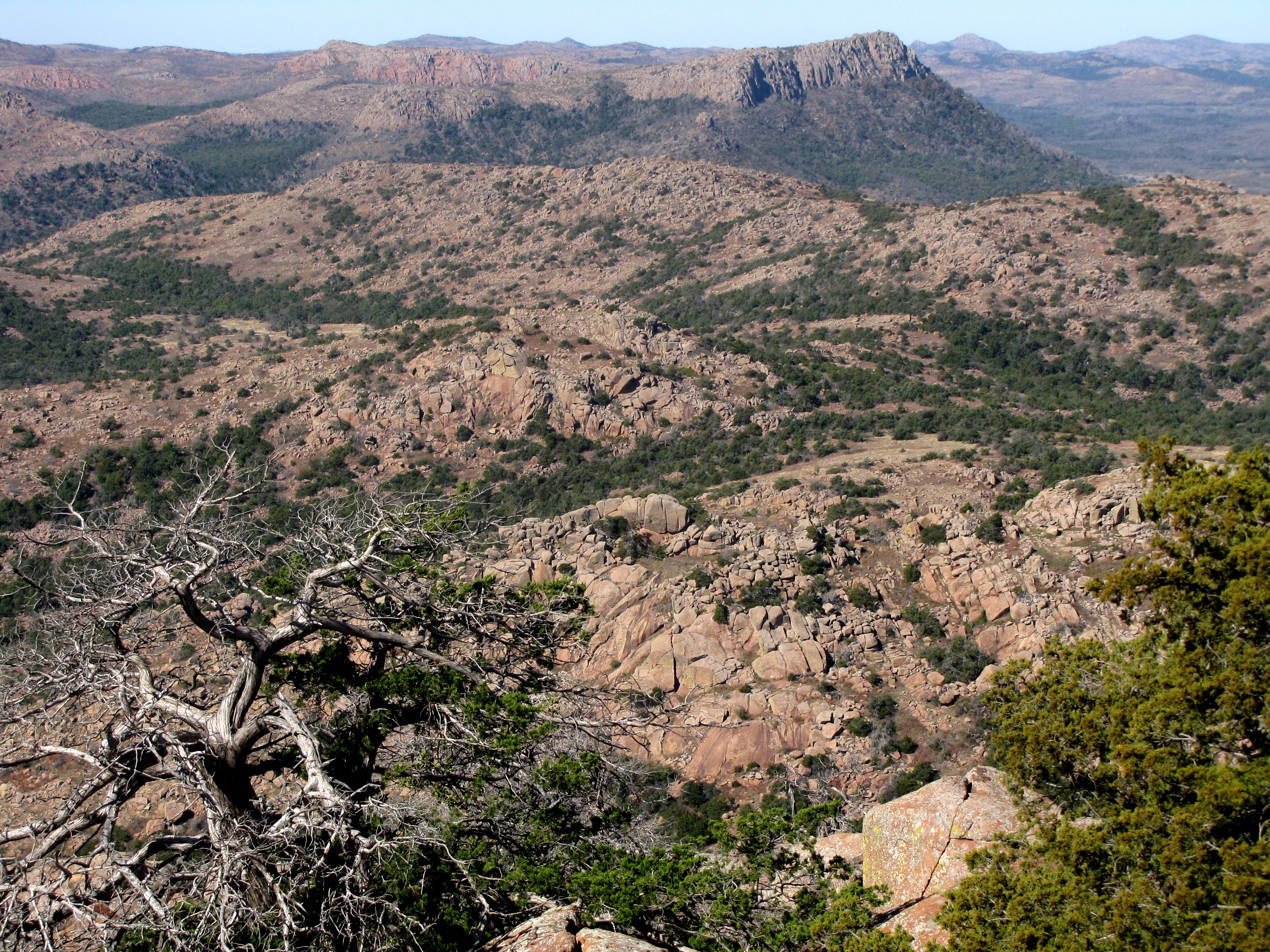
The Roosevelt Gabbros are one of the formations that make up the Wichita Mountains in the Wichita Igneous Province

The Roosevelt Gabbros are an intrusive igneous geological formation in southwestern Oklahoma. They are one of two formations recognized in the Raggedy Mountain Gabbro Group, the other being the Glen Mountain Layered Complex. The Roosevelt Gabbros are generally characterized as biotite gabbros, which form many dikes and sills through the older Glen Mountain Layered Complex. They are named after the town of Roosevelt in Kiowa County, Oklahoma.

== Geologic History ==
The Roosevelt Gabbros were originally intruded in the early Cambrian between the Glen Mountain Layered Complex and the Mount Scott Granite as the southern Oklahoma aulacogen was being formed. The formation of this aulacogen resulted from rifting that took place as the Neoproterozoic supercontinent Pannotia was breaking apart. Isotopic analysis of these intrusive units indicate a rifting age of approximately 532 Ma. The Glen Mountain Layered Complex was intruded as massive far spanning sheets during this rifting at approximately 532.49 ± 0.12 Ma. After the cooling of the Glen Mountain Layered Complex, the Roosevelt Gabbros intruded, forming dikes through the layers and irregularly blobby sills between them. The intrusion of the Roosevelt Gabbros is dated to 532.05 ± 0.12 Ma. Throughout the maturation of this extensional regime, faulting and block rotation causes these intruded units to dip northward. Following this period of mafic magmatism was a period of ceased igneous activity, faulting, uplift, and erosion. Renewed igneous activity then extruded large quantities of felsic lava above the Glen Mountain Layered Complex and intruded Roosevelt Gabbros, forming the overlying Carlton Rhyolite. Further magmatism lead to the intrusion of the Mount Scott Granite above the unconformity between the Glen Mountain Layered Complex and Carlton Rhyolite. The intrusion of the Mount Scott Granite is dated to 530.45 ± 0.14 Ma. As the felsic magma of the Mount Scott granite intruded above the Glen Mountain Layered Complex, an intermediate hybrid layer formed where the Mount Scott Granite came in contact with the Roosevelt Gabbros.

Following the rifting, a basin formed above the igneous units of the southern Oklahoma aulacogen. After the formation of this basin, a period of sedimentation lasting from the Cambrian to the Mississippian buried the aulacogen underneath 4 to 5 kilometers of sediment. Starting in the late Mississippian the Ouachita Orogeny began to uplift the igneous units of the southern Oklahoma aulacogen. After the end of the Ouachita Orogeny in the early Pennsylvanian, the igneous units were once again buried by material eroding off of the Ouachita mountains. Following this sedimentation, erosion up to the present day has uncovered the igneous units of the southern Oklahoma aulacogen.

== Relationship to Glenn Mountain Layered Complex ==
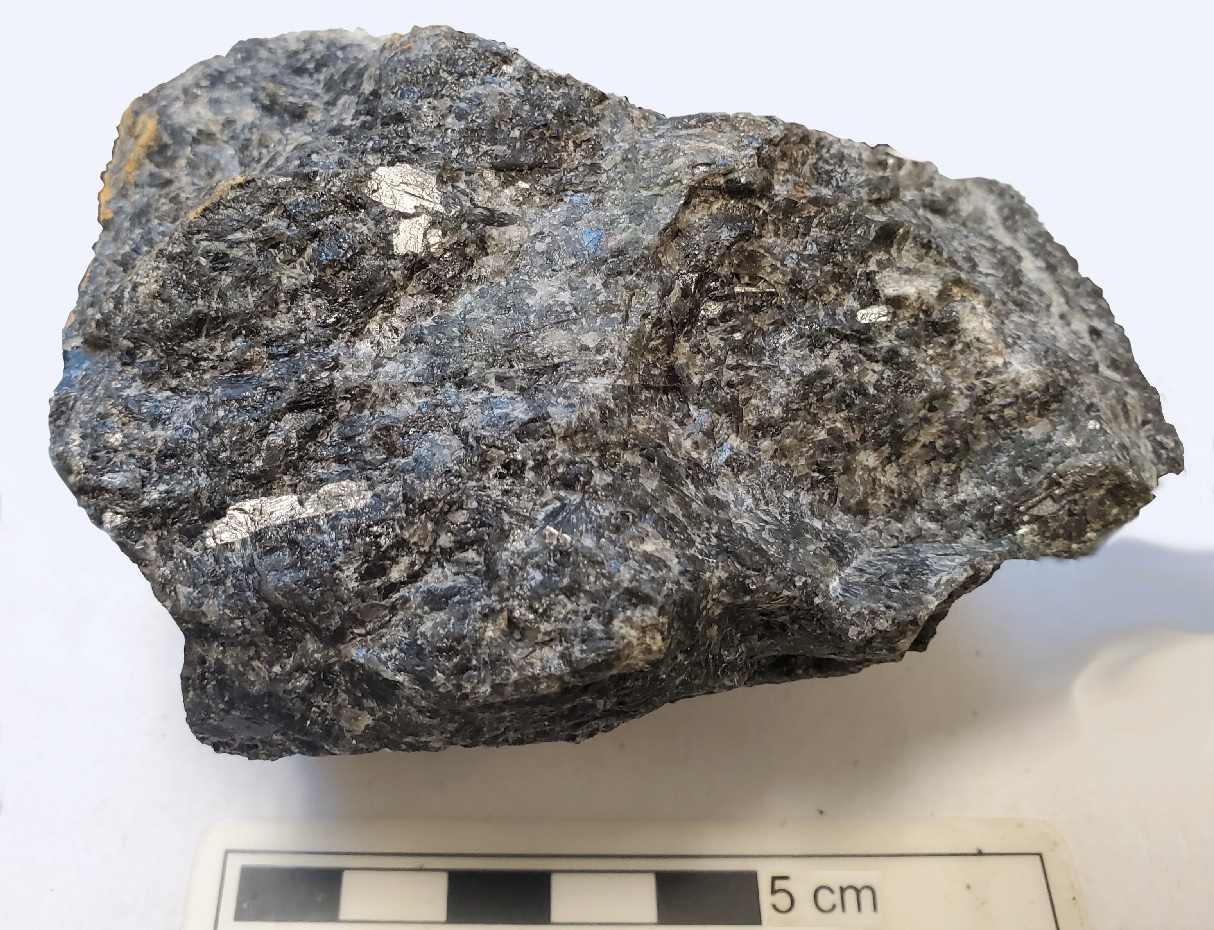
A Roosevelt Gabbro hand sample with characteristic biotite grains

The Roosevelt Gabbros formation is differentiated from the Glen Mountain Layered Complex by the abundant presence of biotite and the inclusion of pink, brown, and green amphiboles. It is also differentiated from the Glen Mountain Layered Complex by the structures it forms, with the Roosevelt Gabbros forming irregular blobby dikes and sills which intrude the older Glen Mountain Layered Complex. It is almost entirely gabbro, with the exception of where the younger Mount Scott Granite contacts the Roosevelt Gabbros. At these contacts more intermediate to felsic rocks such as quartz gabbro and granodiorite are found. This less mafic material is considered to be a hybrid unit between the two intrusions.

== Members ==
The Roosevelt Gabbros has three named members, being the Glenn Creek Gabbro, the Sandy Creek Gabbro, and the Mount Sheridan Gabbro. In addition to these named intrusions, there are many smaller biotite rich gabbro dikes found throughout the southern Oklahoma aulacogen which are also considered to be part of the Roosevelt Gabbros.

=== Glen Creek Gabbro ===
The Glen Creek Gabbro is a member of the Roosevelt Gabbros that forms a sill between two layers of the Glen Mountain Layered Complex. It is composed of biotite-amphibole-olivine gabbro and contains labradorite, augite, and hypersthene. Magnetite, ilmenite, and olivine can be found in segregated ultramafic concentrations. Small amounts of spinel, apatite, and some sulfides can also be found.

=== Sandy Creek Gabbro ===
The Sandy Group Gabbro is a member of the Roosevelt Gabbros that forms blobby irregular sills which are like small plutons. These intrusive blobs are internally differentiated, with the composition becoming increasingly more felsic upwards approaching the overlying Mount Scott Granite. The more mafic lower material is composed of primarily olivine rich gabbro. The more intermediate material higher in the sills are composed of quartz gabbro. Small amounts of ilmenite, magnetite, sulfides, and apatite can be found throughout the Sandy Creek Gabbros, and some of the more felsic material contains small amounts of alkali-feldspar.

=== Mount Sheridan Gabbro ===
The Mount Sheridan Gabbro member of the Roosevelt Gabbros forms a large sill between layers of the Glen Mountain Layered Complex. It is intruded by a sill of the Mount Scott Granite. Similarly to the Sandy Creek Gabbro, the Mount Sheridan Gabbro becomes more felsic upwards through the member. It grades upwards from olivine bearing gabbro into ferrogranodiorite, with the uppermost sections bearing the most quartz, alkali-feldspars, and zircon. Plagioclase, augite, hypersthene, biotite, ilmenite, and magnetite make up most of the mafic material of the Mount Sheridan Group, with small amounts of apatite and sulfides.

== Representative Petrology ==
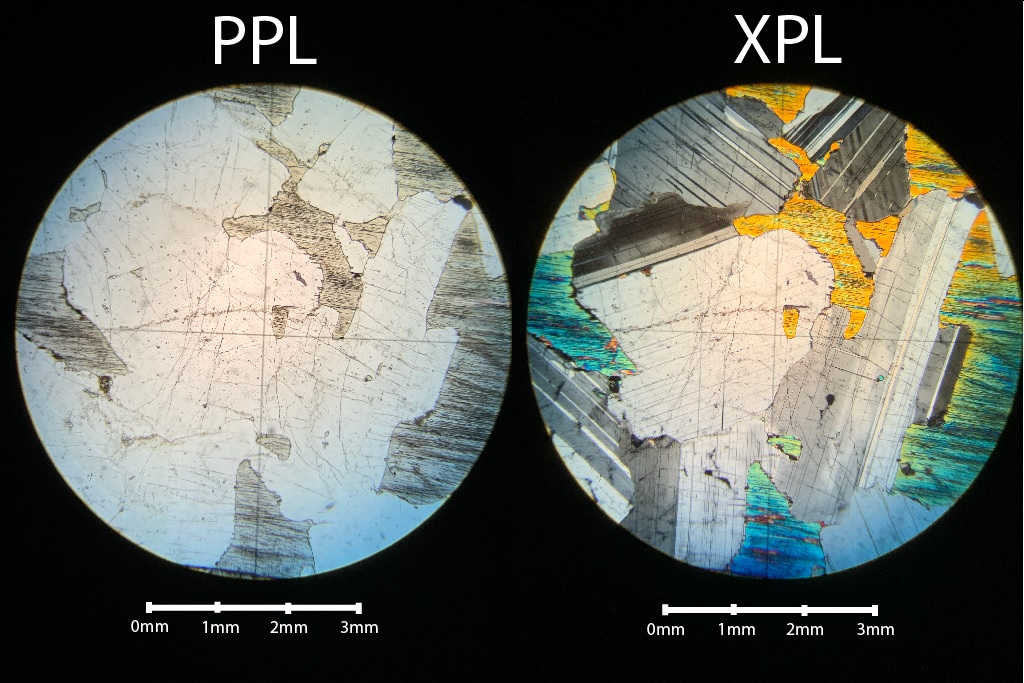
A thin section of the Roosevelt Gabbros in both PPL and XPL revealing pyroxene and plagioclase

Roosevelt Gabbros typically contain both biotite and amphibole, with olivine present in the more mafic samples. Pyroxenes and plagioclase can be found in large quantities in some samples.

The below oxide percentages represent average whole rock chemistry from samples taken from different sills of the Sandy Creek member.

Average Whole Rock Oxide Percentage for Roosevelt Gabbro Samples
| Oxide | High Mg | Moderate Mg | Low Mg | High Ti |
|---|---|---|---|---|
| SiO2 | 45.78 | 47.95 | 54.73 | 43.45 |
| TiO2 | 1.36 | 2.88 | 2.83 | 5.67 |
| Al2O3 | 16.24 | 14.95 | 13.22 | 11.36 |
| Fe2O3 | 11.88 | 13.44 | 12.76 | 18.76 |
| MnO | 0.16 | 0.19 | 0.20 | 0.26 |
| MgO | 12.96 | 6.91 | 3.49 | 6.26 |
| CaO | 9.09 | 10.16 | 7.08 | 10.84 |
| Na2O | 2.03 | 2.6 | 3.51 | 2.19 |
| K2O | 0.30 | 0.58 | 1.64 | 0.33 |
| P2O5 | 0.18 | 0.34 | 0.54 | 0.90 |
| Total | 99.98 | 100.00 | 100.00 | 99.99 |
