= Nepheline-bearing gabbro =

Nepheline-bearing gabbro is an intrusive igneous rock with a composition intermediate between gabbro and nepheline gabbro. It is defined in the QAPF classification as coarse-grained igneous rock in which feldspathoids makes up 0% to 10% of the QAPF mineral fraction and are predominantly nepheline; plagioclase makes up 90% or more of the total feldspar content; and the plagioclase is calcium-rich (%An > 50).
