= Aulacogen =

Failed arm of a triple junction, an inactive rift zone

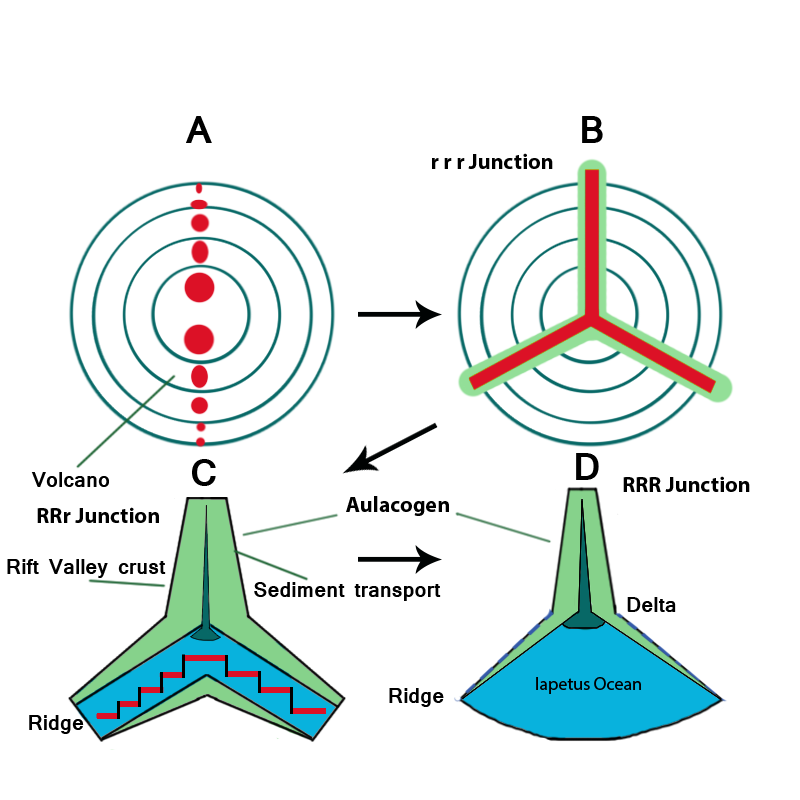
An illustration of the likely formation history of the Southern Oklahoma Aulacogen. In A, volcanoes form along a continental plate boundary. B shows the triple junction's basic appearance following its formation. C shows that one of the three "arms" has not split while the other two do, continuing into D, in which the Iapetus Ocean forms.

An aulacogen is a failed arm of a triple junction. Aulacogens are a part of plate tectonics where oceanic and continental crust is continuously being created, destroyed, and rearranged on the Earth’s surface. Rift zones are places where new crust is formed. An aulacogen is a rift zone that is no longer active.

== Origin of term ==
The term aulacogen is derived from Greek aulax 'furrow' and was suggested by the Soviet geologist Nikolay Shatsky in 1946.

== Formation ==
A triple junction is the point where three tectonic plates meet; the boundaries of these plates are characterized by divergence, causing a rift zone or spreading center; a transform fault; or convergence causing subduction or uplift of crust and forming mountains. The failed arm of a triple junction can be either a transform fault that has been flooded with magma, or more commonly, an inactive rift zone. Aulacogen formation starts with the termination of an active rift zone, which leaves behind a graben-like formation. Over time, this formation starts to subside and eventually minor volcanism starts to take place. The final inversion stage takes place when tectonic stress on the aulacogen changes from tensional to compressional forming horsts. The inversion of ancient, buried aulacogens can exert a dramatic effect on crustal deformation.

== Characteristics ==
Aulacogens can become a filled graben, or sedimentary basin surrounded by a series of normal faults. These can later become the pathway for large river systems such as the Mississippi River. The rock forming an aulacogen is brittle and weak from when the rift zone was active, causing occasional volcanic or seismic activity. Because this is an area of weakness in the crust, aulacogens can become reactivated into a rift zone. An example of a reactivated aulacogen is the East African Rift or the Ottawa-Bonnechere Graben in Ontario and Quebec, Canada, an ancient aulacogen that reactivated during the breakup of Pangaea. Abandoned rift basins that have been uplifted and exposed onshore, like the Lusitanian Basin, are important analogues of deep-sea basins located on conjugated margins of ancient rift axes.

== Examples ==
=== Africa ===
- The Benue Trough in Nigeria, formed as part of the Early Cretaceous rifting that predated the separation of South America from Africa

=== Asia ===
- The Cambay rift in India
- The Kutch rift in India

=== Europe ===
- The Lusitanian Basin, located on the Southwestern European margin (offshore Portugal)
- The Pechora-Kolvin aulacogen in Russia
- The Pachelma aulacogen in Russia
- The Vyatka aulacogen in Russia
- The Sernovodsk-Abdulino aulacogen in Russia
- The Kaltasa aulacogen in Russia

=== North America ===
- The Canadian Grand Banks region, where the Hibernia Oil Field is located.
- The Stenian period Midcontinent Rift System that is still visible at the surface in the area of Lake Superior.
- The Mississippi embayment with the associated New Madrid Seismic Zone is an example of an ancient aulacogen that dates back to the breakup of the ancient continent, Rodinia. This ancient rift was the site of extreme earthquakes in the early 19th century in the region.
- The Southern Oklahoma Aulacogen is an Eocambrian rift system formed as a product of intracontinental rifting during the breakup of Pannotia. The Southern Oklahoma Aulacogen is located in southwestern Oklahoma and extends into northeastern Texas. The Southern Oklahoma Aulacogen is a failed rift zone that was active during the Early Cambrian during the breakup of the supercontinent Rodinia and the opening of the Iapetus Ocean. Volcanism and later faulting associated with the aulacogen created the Wichita and Arbuckle mountains. The rocks that were formed during active rifting of the aulacogen are now exposed in the Wichita and Arbuckle mountains through the processes of uplift and erosion. The majority of these rocks are made up of basalts and other mafic and intermediate lavas, which are typically associated with rift zones. An estimated 250,000 km^{3} of lava was erupted during active rifting.

The Midwestern United States can attribute many of its features to failed rift zones. Rifting in this part of the continent took place in three stages: 1.1 billion years ago, 600 million years ago, and 200 million years ago. Both the aulacogen associated with the Mississippi embayment and the Southern Oklahoma Aulacogen were formed between 500 and 600 million years ago.
