= Concord Gabbro-Syenite Complex =

Geologic formation in North Carolina

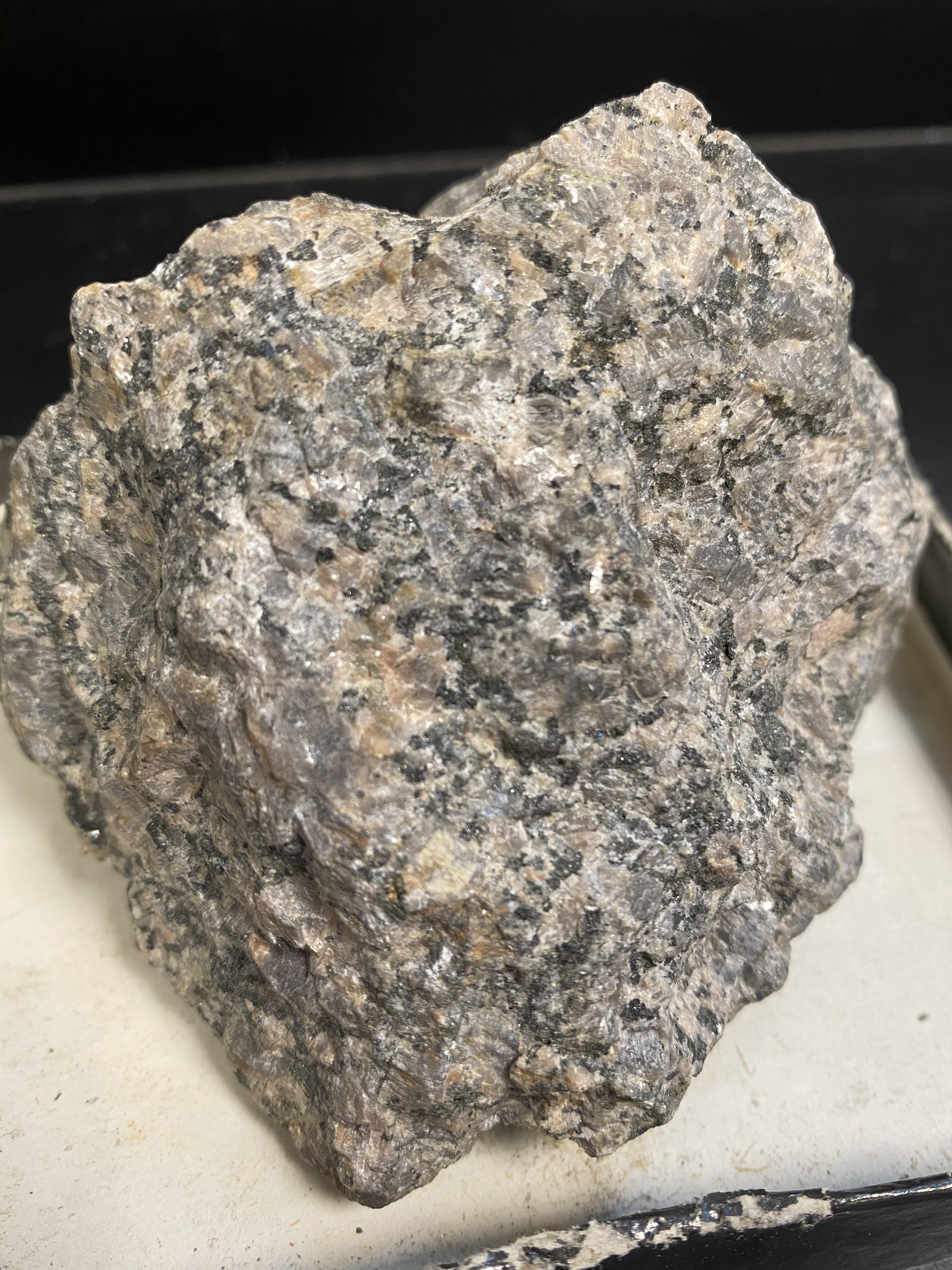
Syenite sample from the Concord Gabbro-Syenite Complex

The Concord Gabbro-Syenite Complex is a Paleozoic pluton located in North Carolina.

== Formation and composition ==
The complex is mainly composed of gabbro and syenite and is of the Silurian-Devonian age. The Concord Gabbro-Syenite Complex is a part of a larger suite of twenty plutons that form a chain extending almost 500 km, which lie within the Charlotte Metamorphic belt. The complex is located in Cabarrus County in south central North Carolina. Many of the Concord plutons have minor quantities of syenite, which form horseshoe-shaped rings around the gabbro. The Concord Gabbro-Syenite Complex within the Concord pluton is dated to 407 ± 36 Ma, making it the oldest formation within the twenty plutons. It is thought unlikely that the plutons located within the Concord Suite formation spanned this much time, implying that complexes such as the Concord Gabbro-Syenite Complex most likely formed during an older Taconic igneous suite.

== Modeling ==
=== Magnetic modeling ===
Magnetic modeling suggests that there are large quantities of magnetite concentrated within the gabbro and the syenite. Despite this, there is no petrologic evidence that would confirm the existence of magnetite within the complex. Three possible explanations have been put forward to explain the magnetization of the two intrusive rocks:

1. There was an induced part of the complex that parallels the present Earth field.
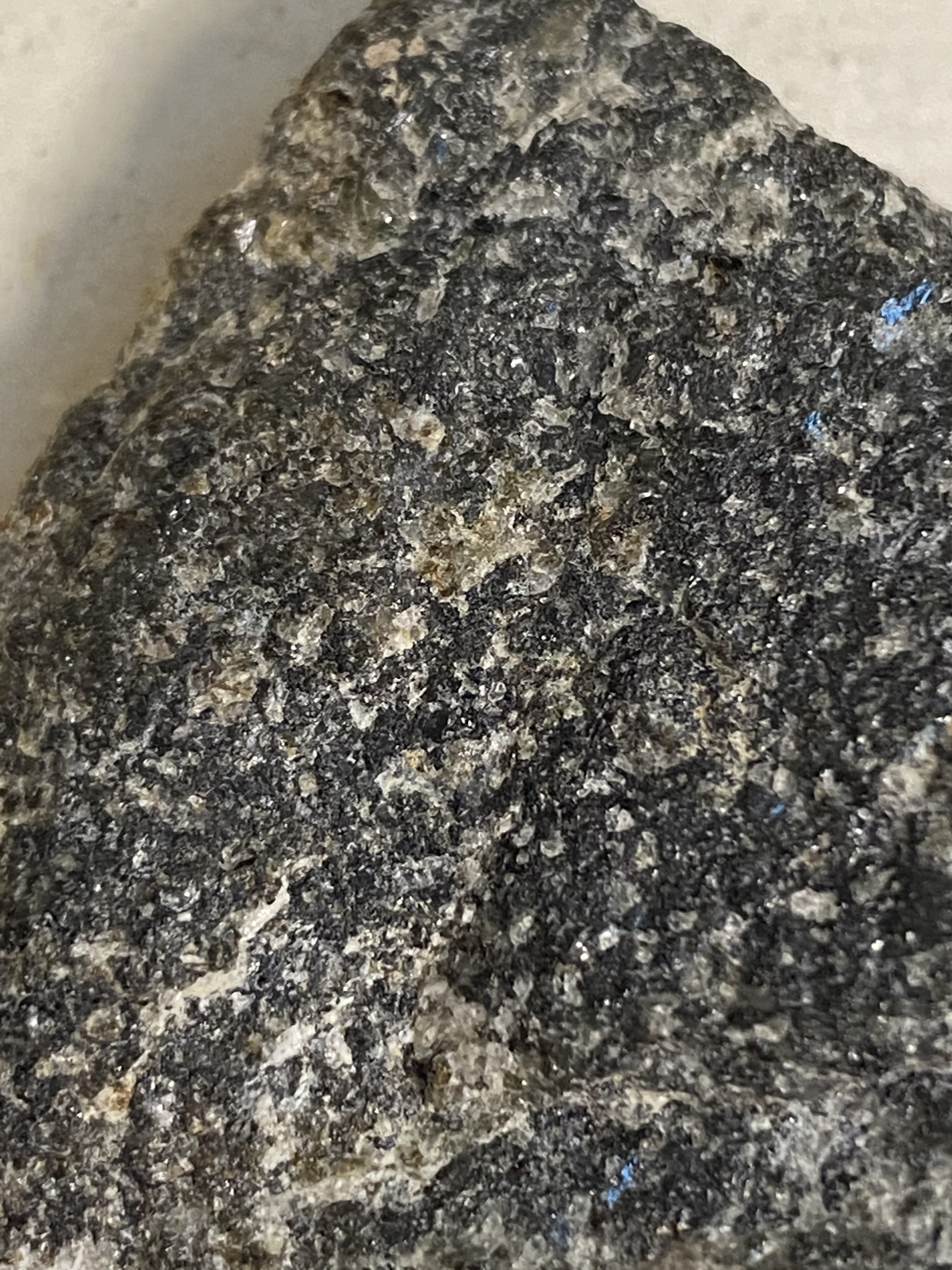
  Gabbro sample from the Concord gabbro-syenite Complex
2. There was a remaining component whose direction depended on the magnetic field of the complex, which was a major component during the placement of the intrusive rocks.
3. There was possible re-magnetization due to tectonics.

=== Gravitational modeling ===
Early gravitational modeling showed that there was a deep gravity source located within the Concord Gabbro-Syenite Complex. It was initially attributed to the depth of the gabbro and syenite plutons within the complex. Subsequent gravitational modeling assumed that the gabbro had a higher density (circa 280 kg/m^{3}) than the surrounding country rock but made no assumptions regarding the density of the syenite.

== Petrology and geochemistry ==
The complex is made up of gabbro and syenite, but more specifically a olivine-plagioclase gabbro and clinopyroxene-plagioclase gabbro.

Thin section of gabbro and syenite from the Concord gabbro-syenite complex in plane-polarized light and crossed polarized light.

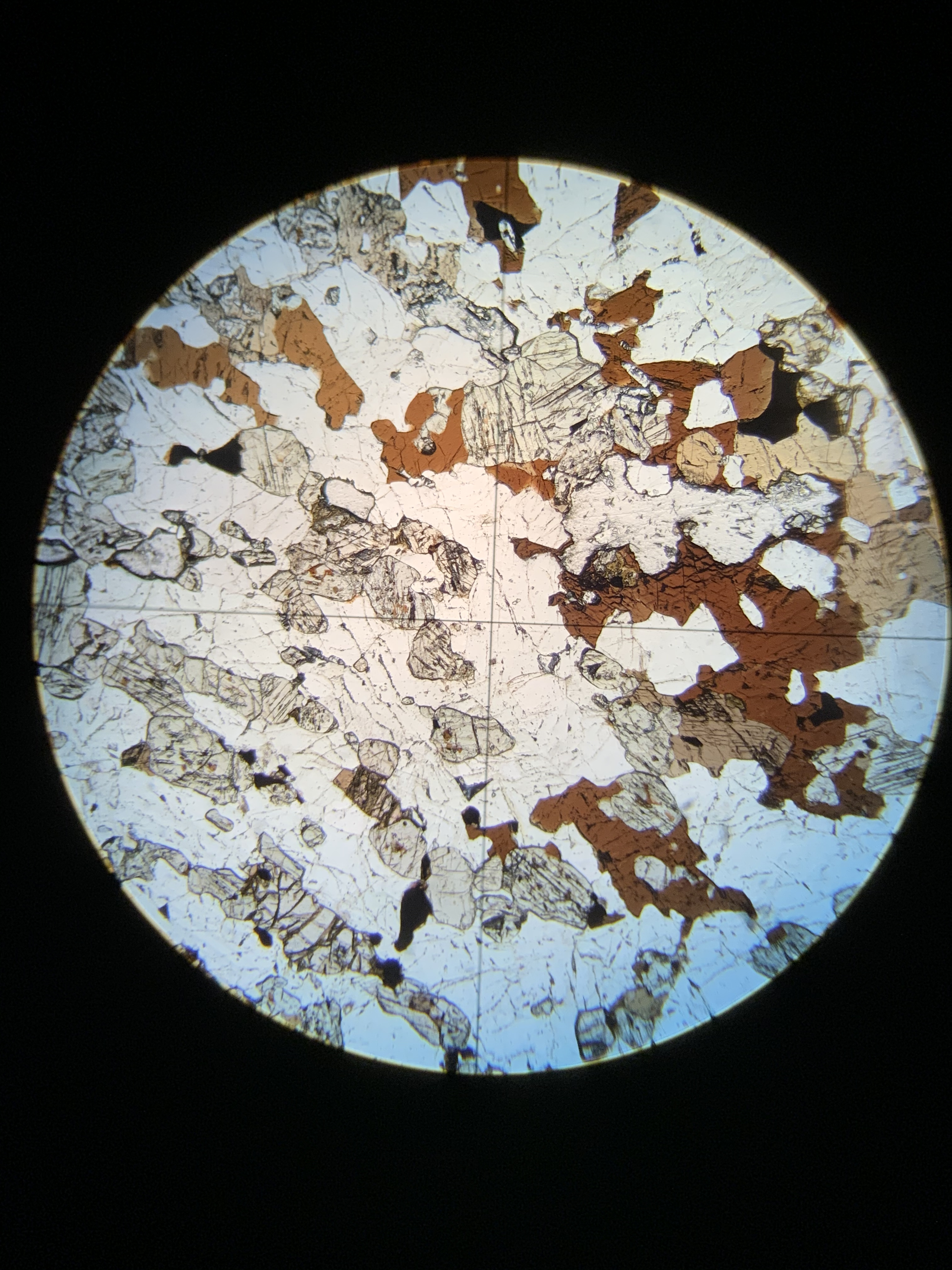
PPL Gabbro

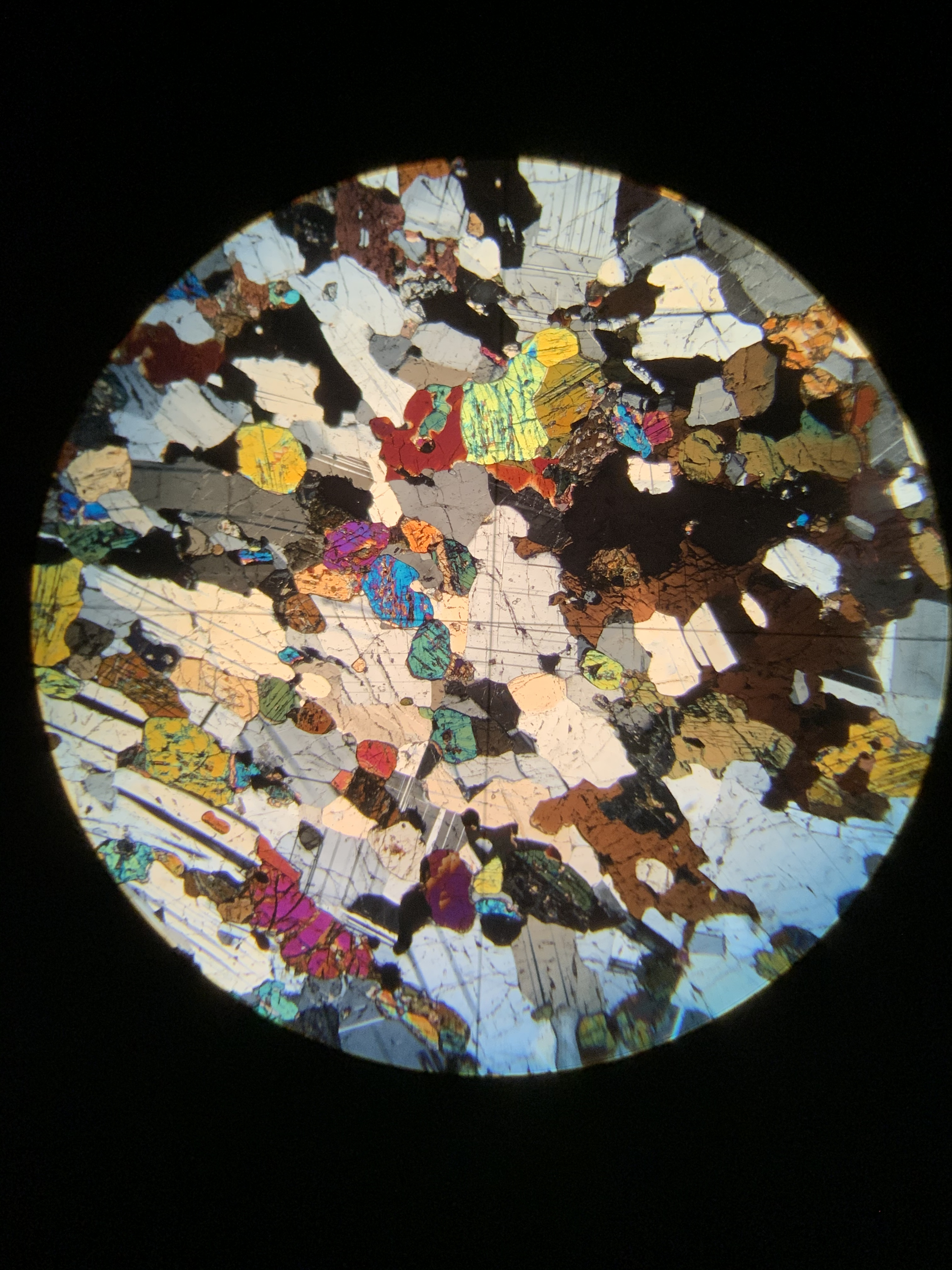
XPL Gabbro

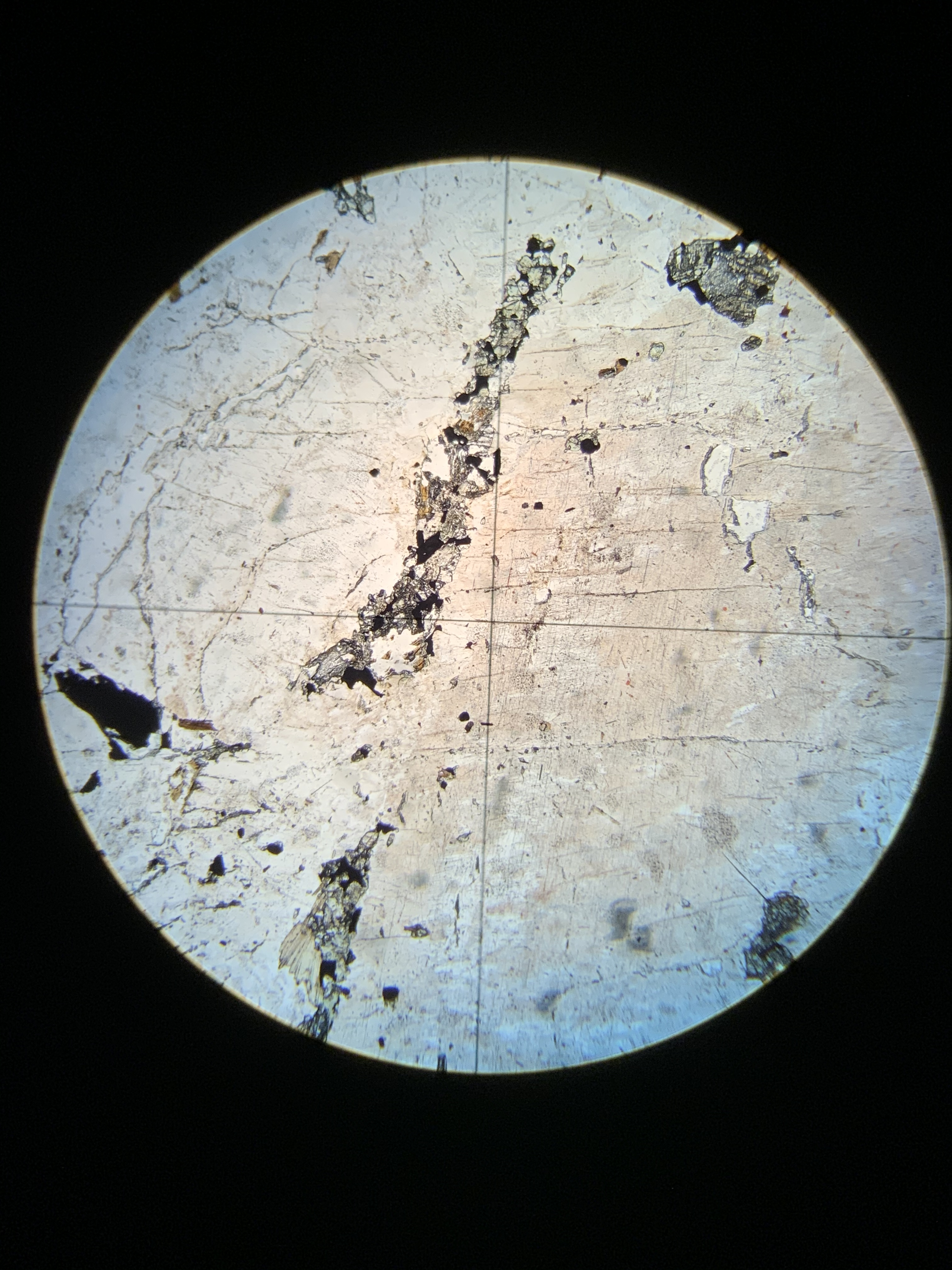
PPL Syenite

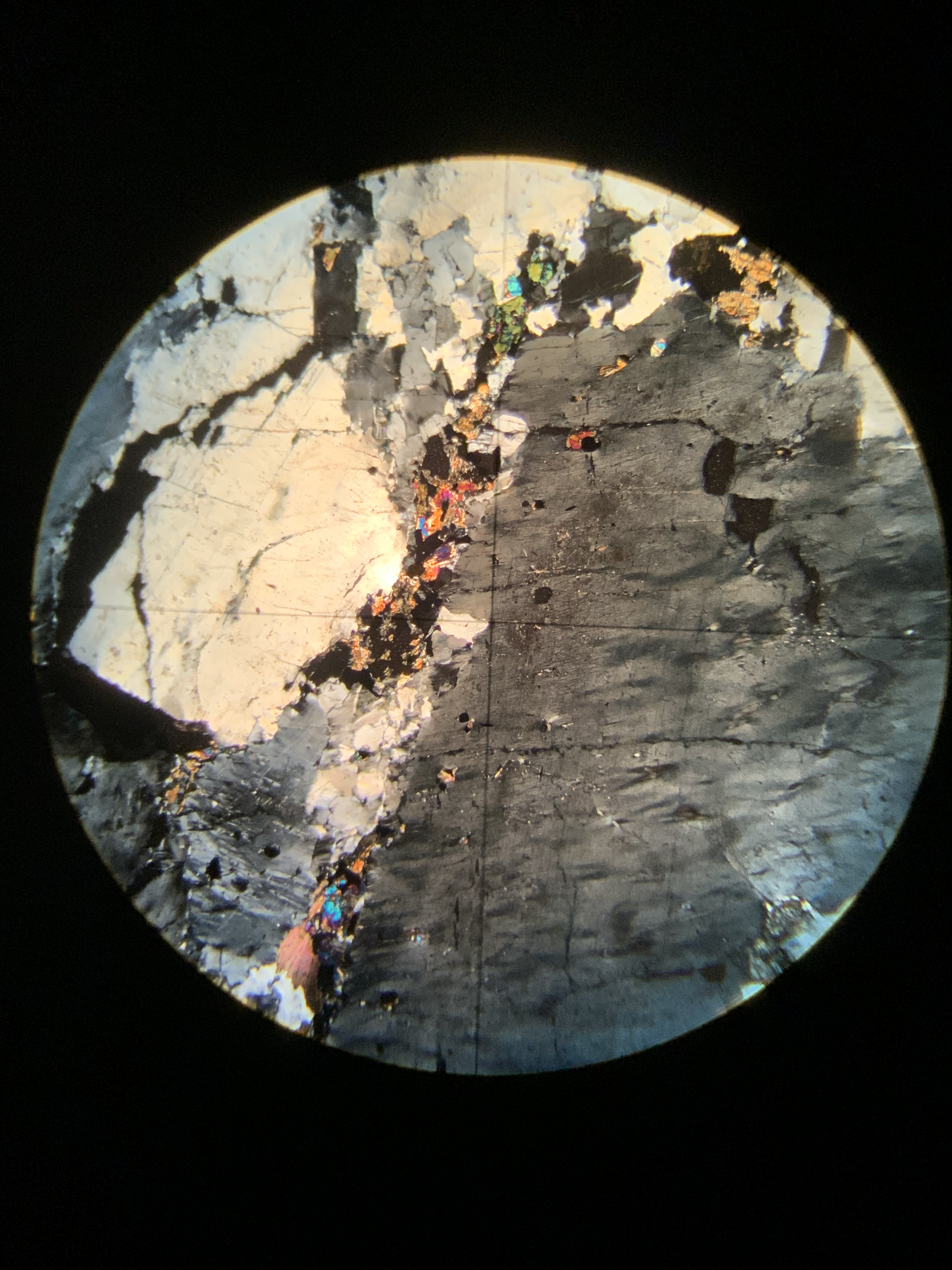
XPL Syenite

=== Mineralogy of Gabbro ===
The gabbro located within the Concord complex is made up of medium-grained olivine-plagioclase and clinopyroxene-plagioclase gabbro consisting of a variety of minerals such as:

- Plagioclase
- Olivine
- Clinopyroxene/orthopyroxene
- Amphibole
- Biotite
- Magnetite

=== Mineralogy of Syenite ===
The syenite located within the Concord complex is made up of coarse-grained phenocrysts of perthite that are surrounded by other various minerals such as:

- Plagioclase
- Microcline
- Clinopyroxene
- Biotite
- Amphibole
- Quartz

=== Chemical composition ===
The average weight % oxides of the Concord gabbro and syenite
Oxide weight %	MnO	FeO^{1}	K_{2}O	CaO	TiO_{2}	Na_{2}O	MgO	Al_{2}O_{3}	SiO_{2}	Total
Gabbro	0.14	9.73	0.31	10.47	1.20	2.51	9.59	17.59	46.9	98.44
Syenite	00.19	3.95	4.41	2.26	1.05	7.45	1.27	17.10	60.8	98.48

== Tectonic setting ==
It is thought that the meta-gabbros present throughout the Concord Gabbro-Syenite Complex were placed approximately 580-520 million years ago (in Ediacaran - Cambrian times) and that a subduction zone caused the igneous activity which created the meta-gabbros. The crystallization of the gabbro and syenite is thought to have occurred 385-415 million years ago, placing its tectonic setting during the Silurian and Devonian periods. During this time, the Charlotte and Carolina slate belts were believed to be connected to the North American Continent against the central Piedmont suture. The thrusting of the belts into the western terrain could have resulted in crustal thickening, melting, and mantle uplifting.
