= Hornblende gabbro =

- Igneous rock

Composition
- Classification: Mafic
- Primary: plagioclase, hornblende
- Secondary: pyroxenes, olivine, biotite
- Texture: Phaneritic

Hornblende gabbro is an intrusive rock similar to normal gabbro (gabbro sensu stricto). In the QAPF classification it falls within the gabbro field, in which quartz makes up 0% to 5% of the QAPF mineral fraction, plagioclase makes up 90% or more of the total feldspar content, and the plagioclase is calcium-rich (%An > 50). Hornblende gabbro is distinguished from other subtypes of gabbro by having a composition almost entirely of plagioclase and hornblende, with olivine and pyroxene each making up less than 5% of its mineral content.
