= Swift Current Gabbro =

Geologic formation in Newfoundland and Labrador

- Stratigraphic range: Neoproterozoic
- Type: Formation
- Unit of: Swift Current Intrusive Suite

Lithology
- Primary: Mafic pluton

Location
- Region: Newfoundland
- Country: Canada

The Swift Current Gabbro is a formation of medium grained diorite and gabbro cropping out in Newfoundland.
