= Quartz gabbro =

Quartz gabbro is an intrusive rock with a composition intermediate between gabbro and tonalite. It is defined in the QAPF classification as coarse-grained igneous rock in which quartz makes up 5% to 20% of the QAPF mineral fraction, plagioclase makes up 90% or more of the total feldspar content, and the plagioclase is calcium-rich (%An > 50).
