= Farmington Gabbro =

- Stratigraphic range: ~ 400 Ma

Location
- Location: Mecklenburg County

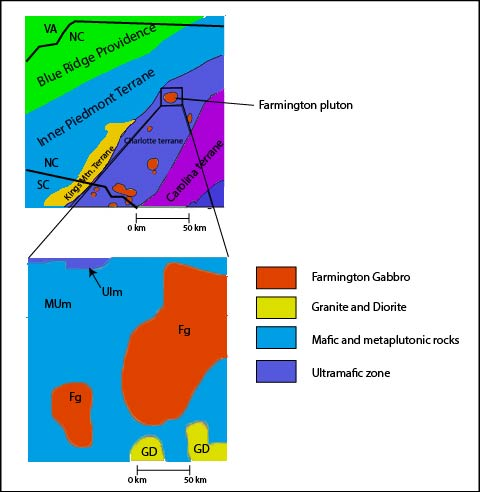
Map of the Concord plutonic suit modified after E. Esawi (2004) and McSween et al (1991)

Located in the Charlotte Belt of North Carolina is the Farmington Gabbro, located in the Mocksville Complex. The Mocksville Complex consist of metamorphosed/unmetamorphosed gabbros, pyroxenites, hornblendites, wehrlites, granites, and diorites. The plutons in this region formed during the Taconic, Acadian, and Alleghanian orogeny starting on the eastern side of Laurentia. These plutons date back to around 400 Ma, consisting of ultramafic, mafic, and felsic rocks but the Farmington Gabbro is the only pluton on the northwest side of the complex that is unmetamorphosed.

== Mocksville Complex ==
The Mocksville Complex is surrounded by late Proterozoic granitic, metavolcanic, and gneissic that trends NE-SW over about a 500 km^{2} area. The complex contains evidence of felsic, mafic, and ultramafic rock types that have been metamorphosed (except farmington gabbro). The age of the complex dates to around 550 million years ago to 650 million years ago. Amphibolites are found in the mafic rocks in the northern section of the complex with bands of plagioclase, quartz, and amphibole with very coarse grained plagioclase and more fine grained amphiboles. Dikes of ultramafic rocks in the complex are peridotites, pyroxenites, and hornblenditites. In the lower end of the complex there are some metamorphosed sedimentary rocks found which are a blend of sandstone and limestone.

For the metagabbros temperatures were found to have reached 550 °C - 650 °C. This was seen by thermal overprint due to Fe-Mg reallocation of existing olivine and calcium rich clinopyroxene. While spinal is found in the complex, garnet is not which infers that the pressure of about 12 kbar or below.

Olivine: medium to high forresteritic (showing a calc-alkali arc environment)

Plagioclase: high in anorthite (showing a calc-alkali arc environment)

Clinopyroxene: high TiO_{2} and Na_{2}O (showing a calc-alkali arc environment)

Pyroxene: high ratio of tetrahedral Al to titian (showing a calc-alkali arc environment)

Spinal: low Mg, variable Fe^{3+}/ (Fe^{3+}+Cr+Al), and high Cr/(Cr+Al) (showing a calc-alkali arc environment)

== Petrology/Mineralogy ==
The Farmington Gabbro is postmetamorphic medium to coarse grained plutonic rock next to metagabbros. The unit is surrounded by Proterozoic to early Paleozoic metamorphosed rock. The major and trace elements of the pluton matches the composition of calc-alkaline basaltic magma. The minerals present are plagioclase, hornblende, pyroxenes, olivine, biotite with small amounts of apatite, magnetite, ilmenite, hematite, pyrite, pyrrhotite, and hercynitic spinel. The main texture in the gabbro is ophitic to sub-ophitic, but hornblende and plagioclase are subhedral to anhedral grains. Plagioclase is twinned with little zoning. The pyroxene content is mostly clinopyroxene with some orthopyroxene.

== Mineral differences ==
The Farmington Gabbro has two gabbronorites that are slightly different in mineralogy and texture. One rock type is an olivine, pyroxene, hornblende while the other has clinopyroxene, olivine, and plagioclase gabbronorite with cumulus texture. The hornblende gabbronorite is a dark grey to grey-green with a fine to medium grained texture.

Bulk rock chemistry of Farmington pluton(Samples taken from around the Farmington Gabbro pluton)
Elements shown in wt%
Sample	1	2	3
SiO2	48.22	47.93	45.56
TiO2	0.60	0.62	0.19
Al2O3	19.35	18.20	14.95
MnO	0.15	0.15	0.11
MgO	8.97	8.73	16.66
FeO	7.82	6.22	5.32
CaO	10.18	12.71	15.64
Na2O	3.88	3.28	0.58
K2O	0.14	0.13	0.33
P2O5	0.02	0.05	0.01
Total	99.34	98.02	99.34

== Outcrops ==
The area of gabbro-diorite intrusions stretches about 720 km long. They are seen as large boulders and on the side of highway 40 NC and highway 158 NC where the hill was cut for the road way. The Mocksville complex consist mostly of metagabbro, but there are outcrops where you can see the contact between the metagabbro rocks and the gabbro (Farmington). The contact could be easily seen because the Farmington Gabbro is the only non-metamorphosed rock unit in this area of plutons so distinguishing between a metagabbro and gabbro may be unchallenging due to the difference in foliation and lineation.

The Vulcan Smith Materials Company mines Farmington Gabbro as an aggregate located off of Highway 40 NC.

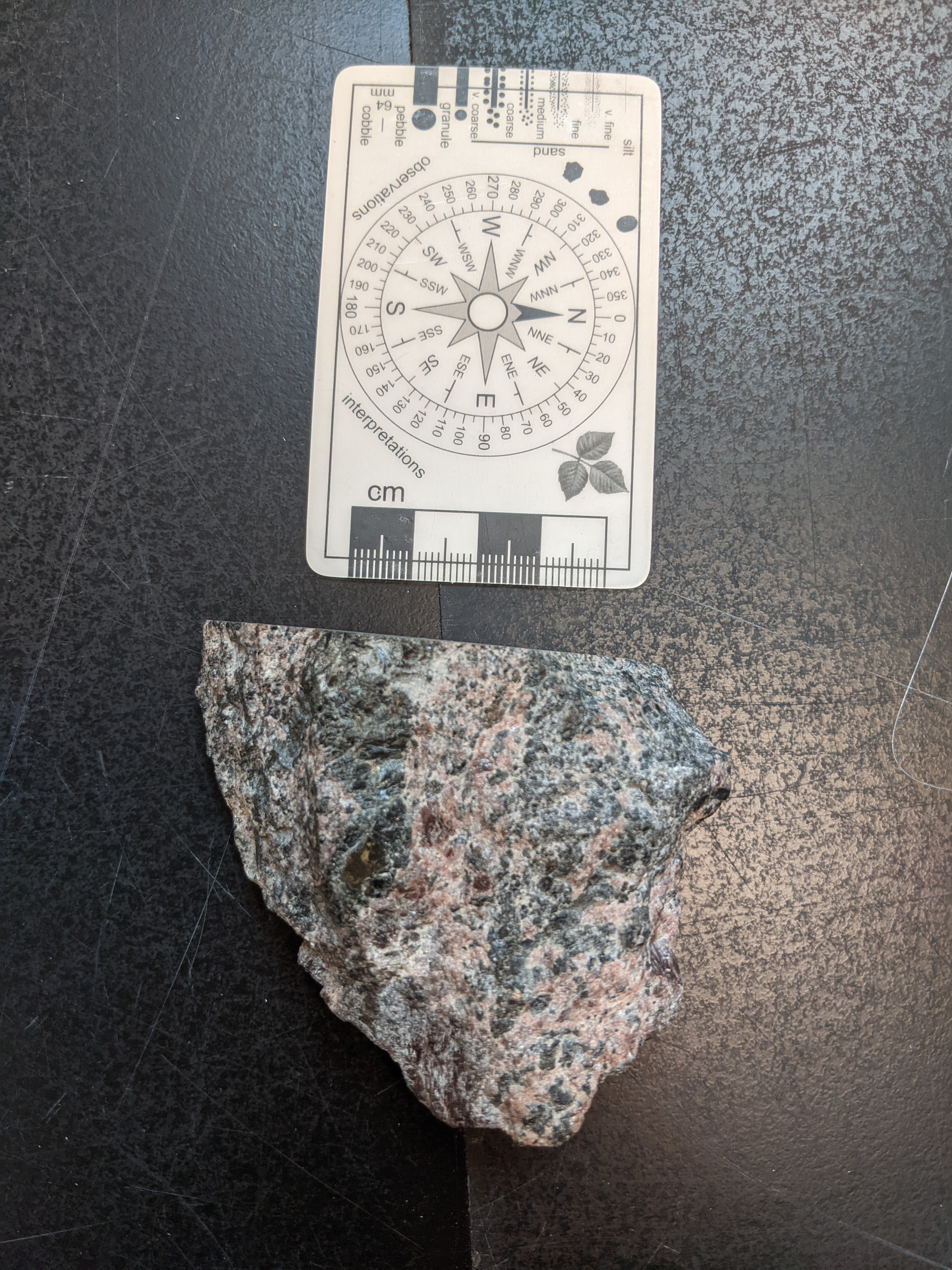
Farmington gabbro taken from the Appalachian state University Geologic and Environmental Science Dept.

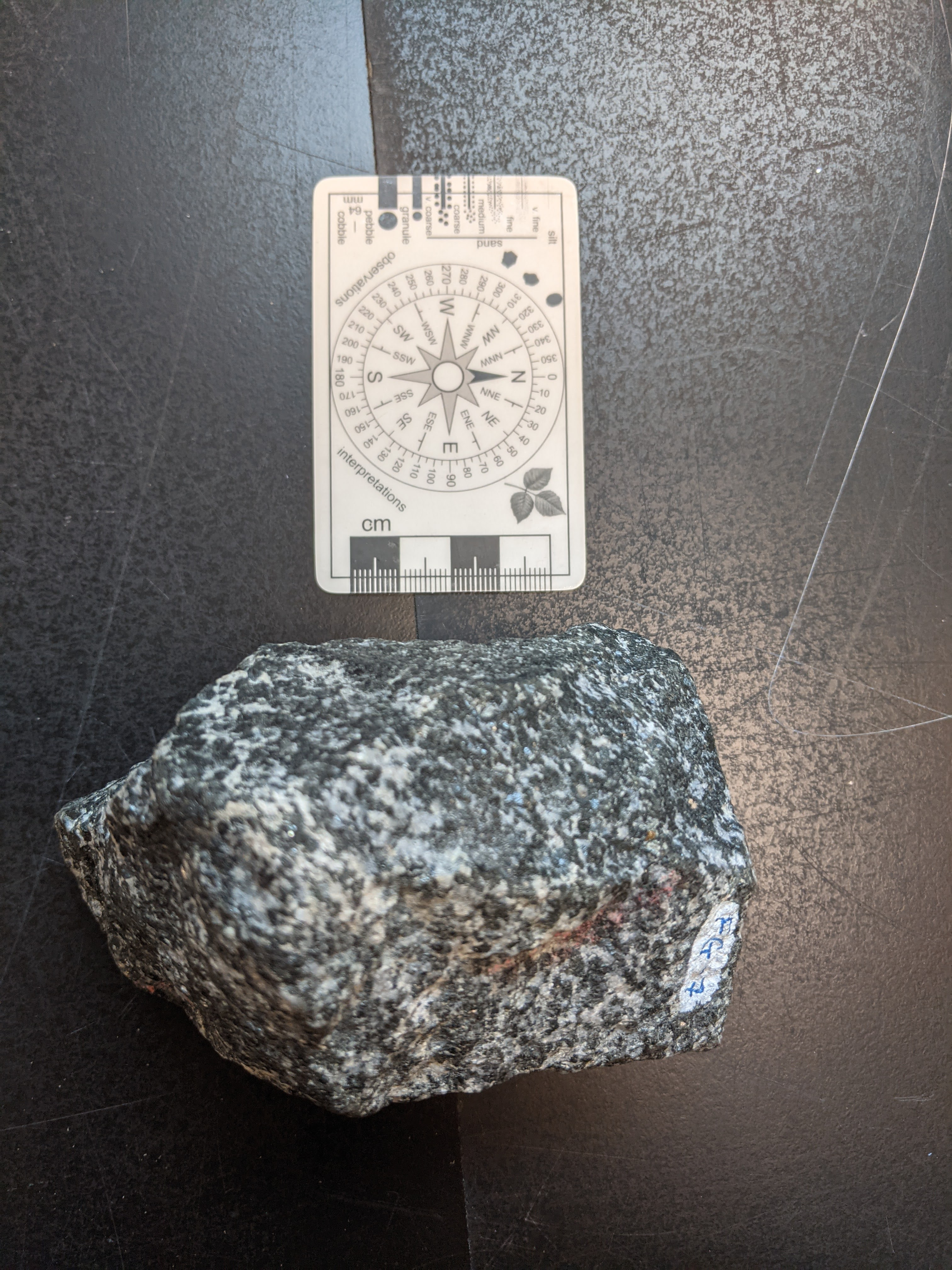
Farmington gabbro taken from the Appalachian state University Geologic and Environmental Science Dept.

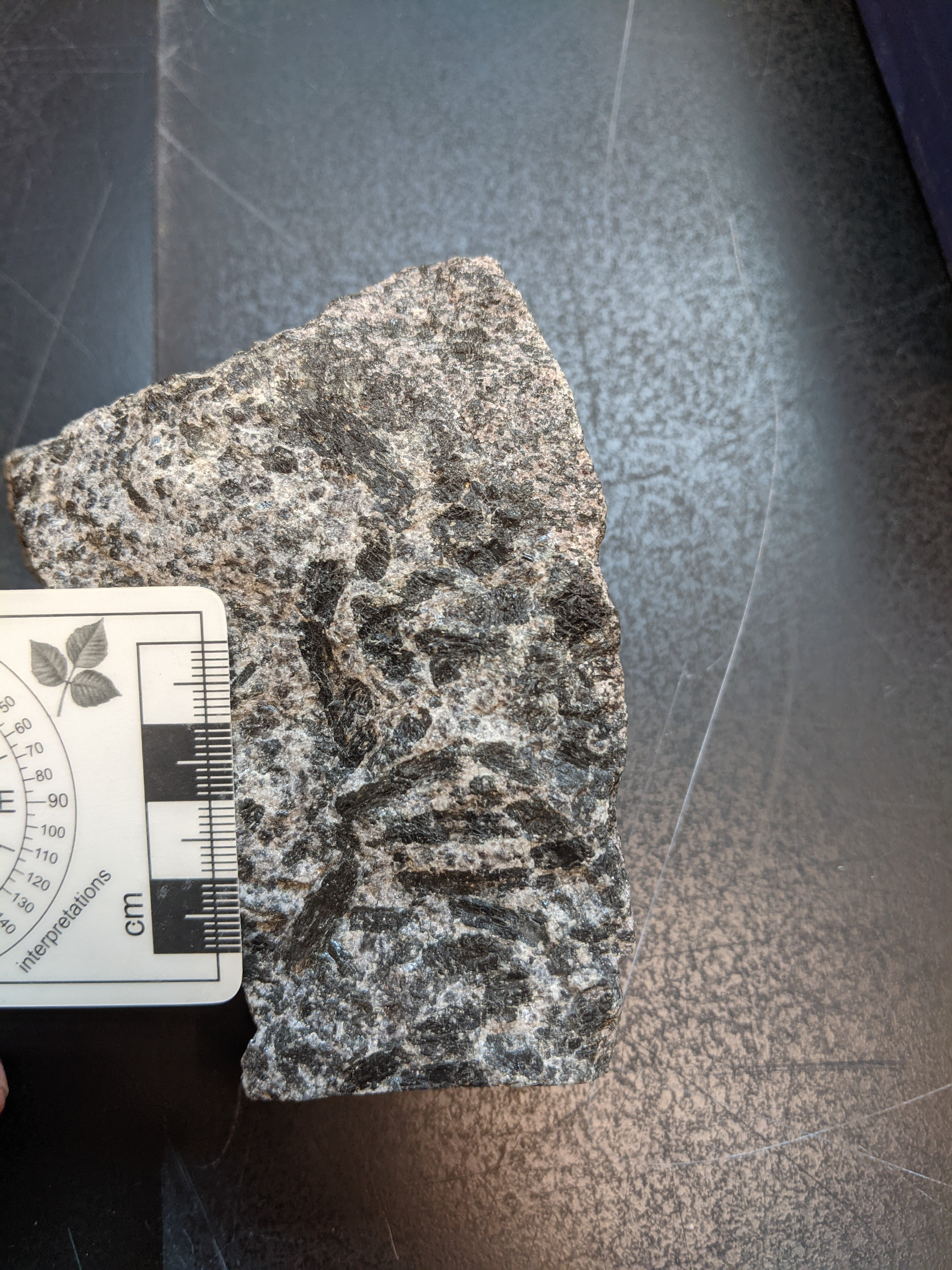
Farmington gabbro taken from the Appalachian state University Geologic and Environmental Science Dept.
