= Tension (geology) =

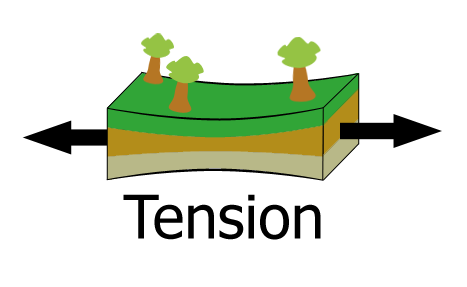
Diagram of geologic tension

In geology, the term tension refers to a stress which stretches rocks in two opposite directions. The rocks become longer in a lateral direction and thinner in a vertical direction. One important result of tensile stress is jointing in rocks. However, tensile stress is rare because most subsurface stress is compressive, due to the weight of the overburden.

== Jointing ==
Tensile stress forms joints in rocks. A joint is a fracture that forms within a rock, whose movement to open the fracture is greater than the lateral movement which takes place. Joints are formed in the direction perpendicular to the least principal stress, meaning they are formed perpendicular to the tensile stress. One way in particular that joints can be formed is due to fluid pressure, as well as at the crest of folds in rocks. This occurs at the peak of the fold or due to the fluid pressure because a localized tensile stress forms, eventually leading to jointing. Another way joints form is due to the change in the weight of the overburden. Since rocks lay under a great deal of overburden, they undergo high temperatures and high pressures. Over time, the rocks are eroded and the weight of the overburden is lifted, so the rocks cool and are under less pressure, which causes the rock to change shape, often forming breaks. As the compression is lifted from the rocks, they are able to react to the tension on them by forming these breaks, or joints.

== Divergent boundaries ==
Geologic tension is also found in the tectonic regions of divergent boundaries. Here, a magma chamber forms underneath oceanic crust and causes seafloor spreading in the creation of new oceanic crust. Some of the force that pushes the two plates apart is due to ridge push force of the magma chamber. Tension, however, accounts for most of the "opposite directions" pull on the plates. As the separating oceanic crust cools over time, it becomes more dense and sinks further and further away from the ridge axis. The cooling and sinking ocean crust causes a tensile stress that also helps drive the pulling apart of the plates at the ridge axis.
