= Anorthite =

Calcium endmember of the plagioclase feldspar series

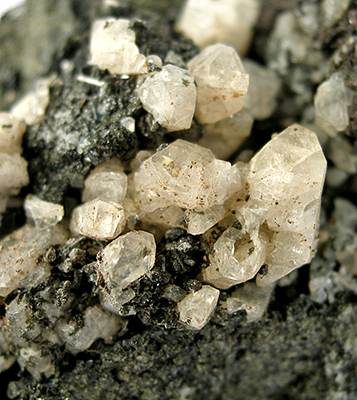
- Anorthite crystals in a basalt vug from Vesuvius (size:6.9 × 4.1 × 3.8 cm)

General
- Category: Tectosilicate minerals
- Group: Feldspar group
- Series: Plagioclase feldspar series
- Formula: CaAl_{2}Si_{2}O_{8} or (Na,Ca)Al_{2}Si_{8} (Na:Ca = 0:100 to 10:90)
- IMA symbol: An
- IMA status: Grandfathered (1823)
- Strunz classification: 9.FA.35
- Crystal system: Triclinic
- Crystal class: Pinacoidal (1̅)
- Space group: P1̅ (no. 2)
- Unit cell: a = 8.1768, b = 12.8768 c = 14.169 [Å]; α = 93.17° β = 115.85°, γ = 92.22°; Z = 8

Identification
- Formula mass: 278.203 g·mol^{−1}
- Color: White, grayish, reddish
- Crystal habit: Anhedral to subhedral granular
- Twinning: Common
- Cleavage: Perfect [001] good [010] poor [110]
- Fracture: Uneven to conchoidal
- Tenacity: Brittle
- Mohs scale hardness: 6
- Luster: Vitreous
- Streak: White
- Diaphaneity: Transparent to translucent
- Specific gravity: 2.72–2.75
- Optical properties: Biaxial (−)
- Refractive index: n_{α} = 1.573–1.577 n_{β} = 1.580–1.585 n_{γ} = 1.585–1.590
- Birefringence: δ = 0.012–0.013
- 2V angle: 78° to 83°
- Melting point: 1550 ± 2°C

Anorthite is the calcium endmember of the plagioclase feldspar mineral series. The chemical formula of pure anorthite is CaAl_{2}Si_{2}O_{8}. Anorthite is found in igneous rocks.

== Mineralogy ==
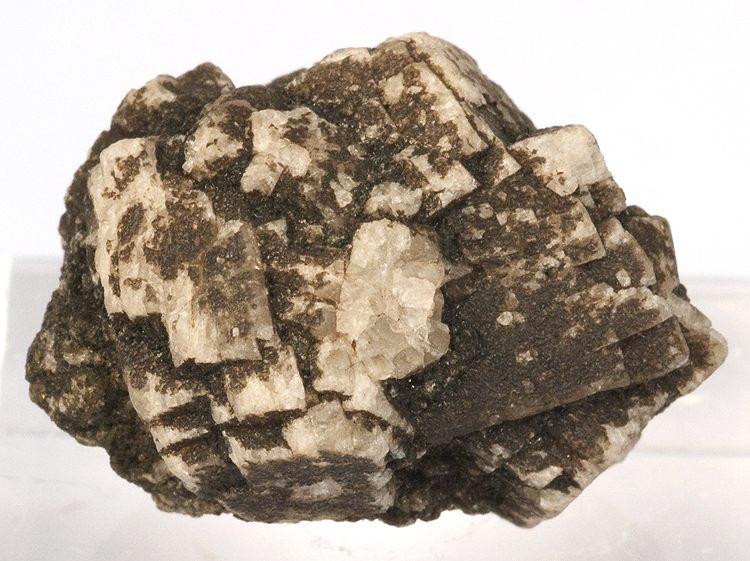
Anorthite crystals (white) in lava from Miyake Island, Japan (size: 2.4 × 1.7 × 1.7 cm)

Anorthite is the calcium-rich endmember of the plagioclase solid solution series, the other endmember being albite (NaAlSi_{3}O_{8}). Pure anorthite, containing no sodium, is rare on Earth. Anorthite also refers, however, to plagioclase compositions with more than 90 molecular percent of the anorthite endmember (and up to 10 molecular percent of the albite endmember). The composition of plagioclases is often expressed as a molar percentage of An%, or (for a specific quantity) An_{n}, where n = Ca/(Ca + Na) × 100. This equation predominantly works in a terrestrial context; exotic locales and in particular Lunar rocks may need to account for other cations, such as Fe^{2+}, to explain differences between optically and structurally derived An% data observed in Lunar anorthites.

At standard pressure, pure anorthite (An_{100}) melts at 1550 ± 2 °C (2822 °F).

== Occurrence ==
Anorthite is a compositional variety of plagioclase. It occurs in mafic igneous rock. It also occurs in metamorphic rocks of granulite facies, in metamorphosed carbonate rocks, and corundum deposits. Its type localities are Monte Somma and Valle di Fassa, Italy. It was first described in 1823. It is more rare in surficial rocks than it normally would be due to its high weathering potential in the Goldich dissolution series.

It also makes up much of the lunar highlands; the Genesis Rock, collected during the 1971 Apollo 15 mission, is made of anorthosite, a rock composed largely of anorthite. Anorthite was discovered in samples from comet Wild 2, and the mineral is an important constituent of Ca-Al-rich inclusions in rare varieties of chondritic meteorites.

== See also ==
- List of minerals
- Lunar highlands
- Lunar regolith
