= Mafic =

Silicate mineral or igneous rock that is rich in magnesium and iron

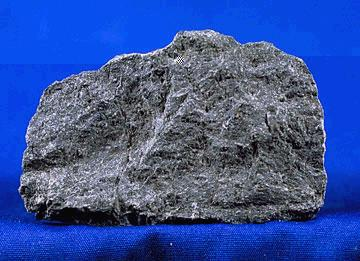
Basalt

Mafic is a term used in geology to describe silicate minerals, magmas, and igneous rocks that are rich in magnesium and iron, while being relatively low in silica content. Common rock-forming mafic minerals include olivine, pyroxene, amphibole, and biotite. Common mafic rocks include basalt, diabase and gabbro. Mafic rocks often also contain calcium-rich varieties of plagioclase feldspar. Mafic materials can also be described as ferromagnesian.

Mafic rocks and minerals occupy one end of a spectrum of chemical composition, with felsic rocks and minerals at the opposite end. In general, mafic rocks tend to be dark in color, dense, and found primarily in oceanic crust, while felsic rocks tend to be light in color, less dense, and found primarily in continental crust.

== History ==
The term mafic is a portmanteau of "magnesium" and "ferric" and was coined by Charles Whitman Cross, Joseph P. Iddings, Louis V. Pirsson, and Henry Stephens Washington in 1912. Cross's group had previously divided the major rock-forming minerals found in igneous rocks into salic minerals, such as quartz, feldspars, or feldspathoids, and femic minerals, such as olivine and pyroxene. However, micas and aluminium-rich amphiboles were excluded, while some calcium minerals containing little iron or magnesium, such as wollastonite or apatite, were included in the femic minerals. Cross and his coinvestigators later clarified that micas and aluminium amphiboles belonged to a separate category of alferric minerals. They then introduced the term mafic for ferromagnesian minerals of all types, in preference to the term femag coined by A. Johannsen in 1911, whose sound they disliked.

== Mineralogy ==
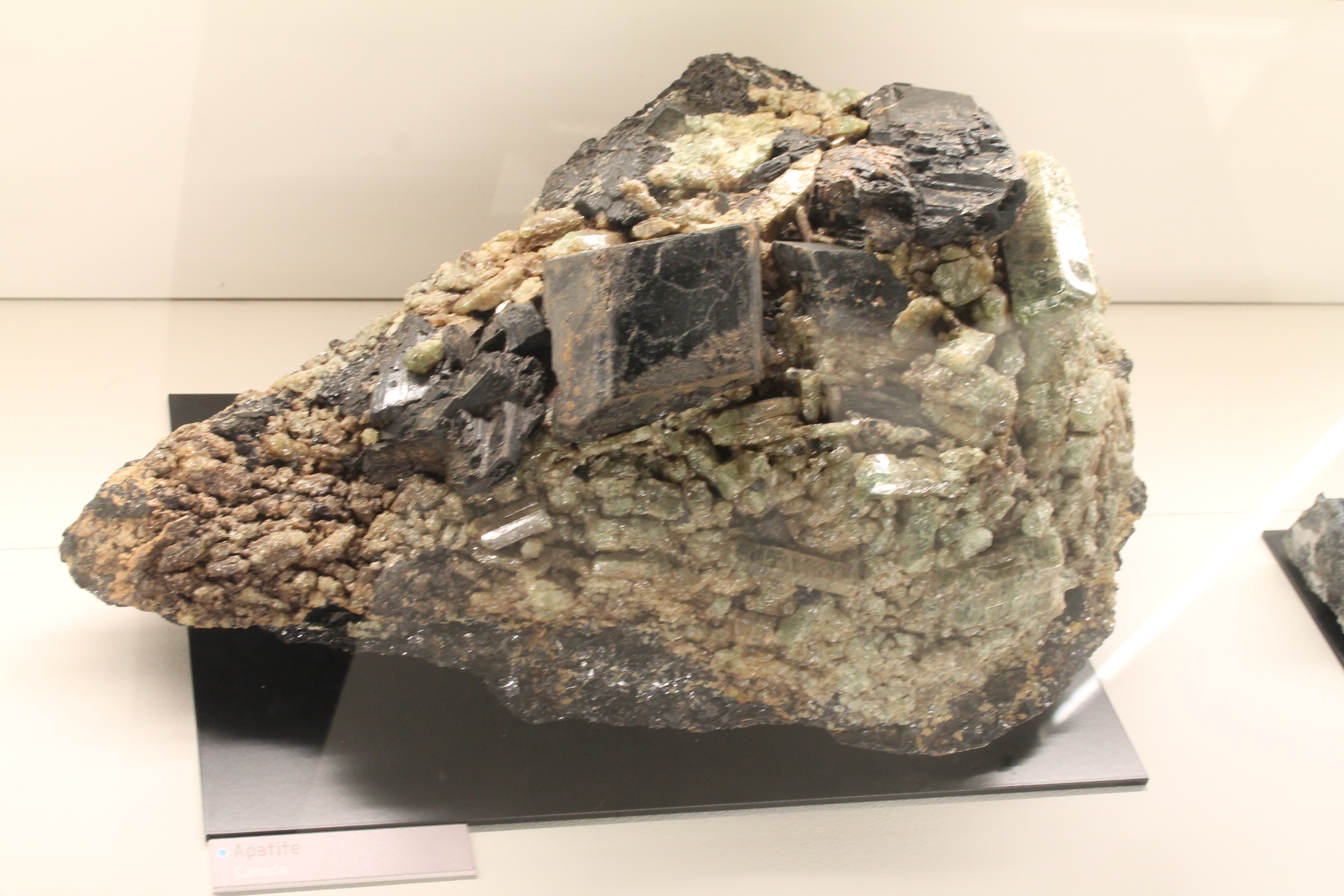
Apatite

The term mafic is still widely used for dark-colored ferromagnesian minerals. Modern classification schemes, such as the International Union of Geological Sciences (IUGS) classification of igneous rocks, include some light-colored ferromagnesian minerals, such as melilite, in the mafic mineral fraction. Accessory minerals, such as zircon or apatite, may also be included in the mafic mineral fraction for purposes of precise classification.

In Earth's interior, this ferromagnesian dominance is reflected in the mantle's composition. Bridgmanite, a magnesium and iron-rich silicate, constitutes the majority of Earth's lower mantle and is consistent with its ultramafic geochemical character.

== Rocks ==
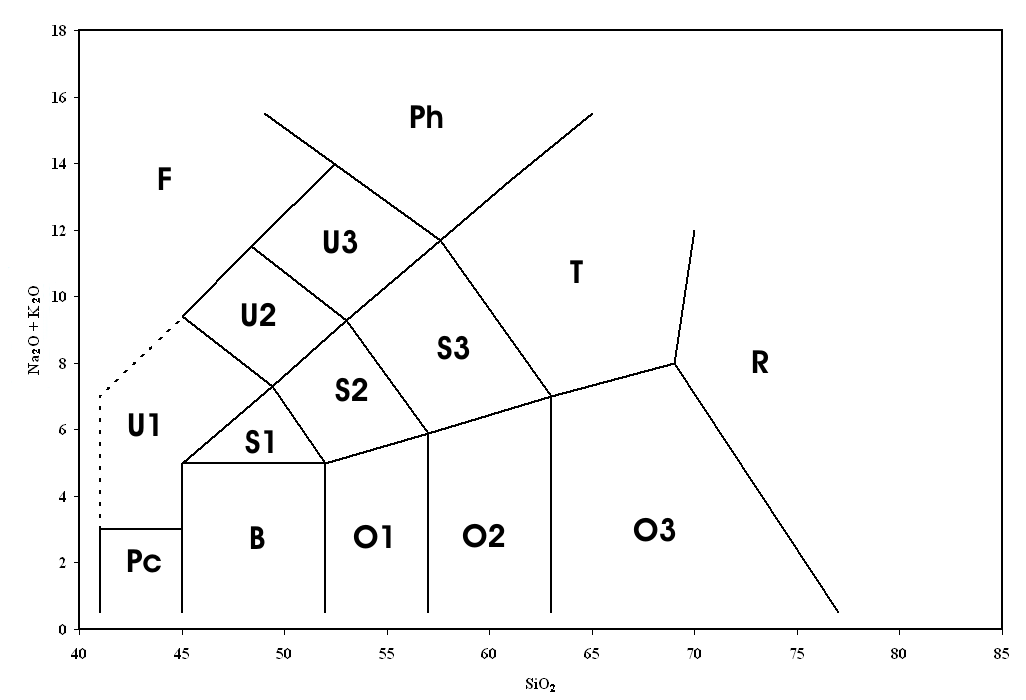
Total alkali-silica (TAS) diagram for classification of volcanic rocks (after Le Maitre et al., 2002)

When applied to rocks, the term mafic is used primarily as a field term to describe dark-colored igneous rocks. The term is not used as a rock classification in the IUGS classification scheme. Mafic rocks are sometimes more precisely defined as igneous rocks with a high proportion of pyroxene and olivine, so that their color index (the volume fraction of dark mafic minerals) is between 50 and 90. Most mafic volcanic rocks are more precisely classified as basalts.

Chemically, mafic rocks are sometimes defined as rocks with a silica content between 45 and 55 wt%, corresponding to the silica content of basalt in the TAS classification. Such rocks are enriched in iron, magnesium, and calcium and typically dark in color. In contrast, the felsic rocks are typically light in color and enriched in aluminium and silicon along with potassium and sodium. Mafic rocks also typically have a higher density than felsic rocks. The term roughly corresponds to the older basic rock class.

== Geological significance ==
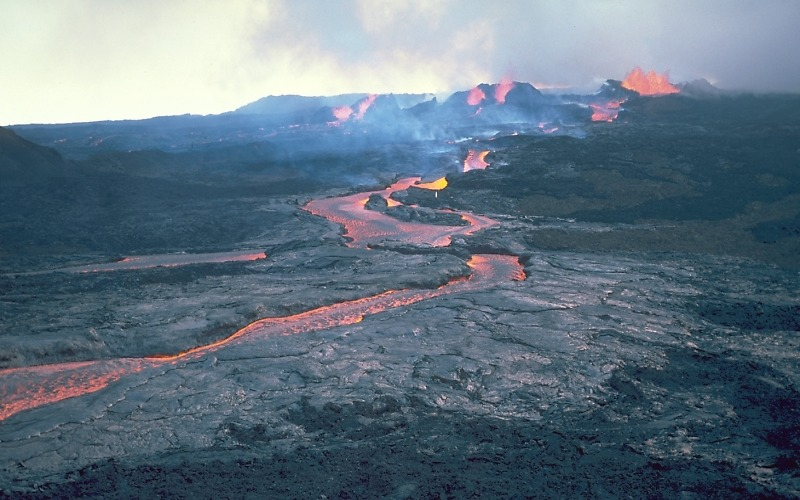
An ʻaʻā flow from Mauna Loa (a volcano in Hawaii), composed of mafic magma.

Mafic rocks are a major component of Earth's crust and are closely linked to processes happening within the mantle. They form primarily through the partial melting of mantle peridotite and provide insight into mantle composition and melt generation. Basalt, the most common mafic igneous rock, is produced at mid-ocean ridges by decompression melting of upwelling mantle material and constitutes a majority of oceanic crust.

Upon eruption, mafic lava has less viscosity than felsic lava, due to the lower silica content in mafic magma. Water and other volatiles can more easily and gradually escape from mafic lava. As a result, eruptions of volcanoes made of mafic lavas are less explosive than felsic-lava eruptions.

== See also ==
- QAPF diagram
- List of minerals
- List of rock types
- Bowen's reaction series
