= Normative mineralogy =

Calculation of the composition of a rock

Normative mineralogy is a calculation of the composition of a rock sample that estimates the idealised mineralogy of a rock based on a quantitative chemical analysis according to the principles of geochemistry.

Normative mineral calculations can be achieved via either the CIPW Norm or the Barth-Niggli Norm (also known as the Cation Norm).

Normative calculations are used to produce an idealised mineralogy of a crystallized melt. First, a rock is chemically analysed to determine the elemental constituents. Results of the chemical analysis traditionally are expressed as oxides (e.g., weight percent Mg is expressed as weight percent MgO). The normative mineralogy of the rock then is calculated, based upon assumptions about the order of mineral formation and known phase relationships of rocks and minerals, and using simplified mineral formulas. The calculated mineralogy can be used to assess concepts such as silica saturation of melts.

Because the normative calculation is essentially a computation, it can be achieved via computer programs.

== CIPW Norm ==
The CIPW Norm was developed in the early 1900s and named after its creators, the petrologists Charles Cross, Joseph Iddings, Louis Pirsson, and the geochemist Henry Washington. The CIPW normative mineralogy calculation is based on the typical minerals that may be precipitated from an anhydrous melt at low pressure, and simplifies the typical igneous geochemistry seen in nature with the following four constraints:

- The magma crystallizes under anhydrous conditions so that no hydrous minerals (hornblende, biotite) are formed.
- The ferromagnesian minerals are assumed to be free of Al_{2}O_{3}.
- The Fe/Mg ratio for all ferromagnesian minerals is assumed to be the same.
- Several minerals are assumed to be incompatible, thus nepheline and/or olivine never appear with quartz in the norm.

This is an artificial set of constraints, and therefore the results of the CIPW norm do not reflect the true course of igneous differentiation in nature.

The primary benefit of calculating a CIPW norm is determining what the ideal mineralogy of an aphanitic or porphyritic igneous rock is. Secondly, the degree of silica saturation of the melt that formed the rock can be assessed in the absence of diagnostic feldspathoid species.

The silica saturation of a rock varies not only with silica content but the proportion of the various alkalis and metal species within the melt. The silica saturation eutectic plane is thus different for various families of rocks and cannot be easily estimated, hence the requirement to calculate whether the rock is silica saturated or not.

This is achieved by assigning cations of the major elements within the rock to silica anions in modal proportion, to form solid solution minerals in the idealised mineral assemblage starting with phosphorus for apatite, chlorine and sodium for halite, sulfur and FeO into pyrite, FeO and Cr_{2}O_{3} is allocated for chromite, FeO and equal molar amount of TiO_{2} for ilmenite, CaO and CO_{2} for calcite, to complete the most common non-silicate minerals. From the remaining chemical constituents, Al_{2}O_{3} and K_{2}O are allocated with silica for orthoclase; sodium, aluminium and potassium for albite, and so on until either there is no silica left (in which case feldspathoids are calculated) or excess, in which case the rock contains normative quartz.

== Normative and modal mineralogy ==
Normative mineralogy is an estimate of the mineralogy of the rock. It usually differs from the visually observable mineralogy, at least as much as the types of mineral species, especially amongst the ferromagnesian minerals and feldspars, where it is possible to have many solid solution series of minerals, or minerals with similar Fe and Mg ratios substituting, especially with water (e.g.; amphibole and biotite replacing pyroxene).

However, in aphanites, or rocks with phenocrysts clearly out of equilibrium with the groundmass, a normative mineral calculation is often the best to understand the evolution of the rock and its relationship to other igneous rocks in the region.

== Cautions ==
The CIPW Norm or Cation Norm is a useful tool for assessing silica saturation or oversaturation; estimations of minerals in a mathematical model are based on many assumptions and the results must be balanced with the observable mineralogy. The following areas create the most errors in calculations;

- Cumulate rocks. While a normative mineral calculation isn't necessarily improper for use on cumulate rocks, the information gleaned is of doubtful value because a cumulate rock does not represent the melt from which it was extracted. However, if the groundmass of a cumulate can be analysed, it is valid to use a normative calculation to gain information about the parental melt.
- Oxidation state. Because the normative calculation divides Fe between oxide phases and availability for silicate phases, based on estimates of the ratio of Fe^{2+}/Fe^{3+}, miscalculating the ratio for the rock in question may produce erroneous amounts of magnetite or hematite, or alter the silicate mineralogy. If the Fe^{2+}/Fe^{3+} ratio is known for the sample, the resulting calculation should match the observed mineralogy more closely.
- Pressure and temperature. Because the CIPW Norm is based on anhydrous melts and crystallisation at fairly low pressures, the resultant normative mineralogy does not reflect observed mineralogy for all rock types, especially those formed within the mantle. The normative mineralogy is not entirely accurate at reflecting the mineralogy of rocks formed at high pressures where, for instance, phlogopite may substitute for amphibole, amphibole for olivine and so forth. Altered normative calculations have been developed that more correctly reflect the particular pressure regimes of the deep crust and mantle.
- Carbon dioxide. The influence of CO_{2} on most silicate melts is fairly minor but in some cases, especially carbonatite, but also certain lamprophyre type rocks, kimberlite and lamproite, the presence of carbon dioxide and calcite in the melt or accessory phases derives erroneous normative mineralogy. This is because if carbon is not analyzed, there is excess calcium, causing normative silica undersaturation, and increasing the calcium silicate mineral budget. Similarly, if graphite is present (as is the case with some kimberlites) this can produce excess C, and hence skew the calculation toward excess carbonate. Excess elemental C also, in nature, results in reduced oxygen fugacity and alters Fe^{2+}/Fe^{3+} ratios.
- Halides. The presence of some halides and non-metallic elements in the melt alter the resulting chemistry. For instance, boron forms tourmaline; excess chlorine may form scapolite instead of feldspar. This is generally rare, except in some A-type granites and related rocks.
- Mineral disequilibrium. Similar to cumulate rocks, a rock may contain extraneous minerals inherited from earlier melts, or may even contain xenoliths or restite. It is improper to calculate normative mineralogy on an igneous breccia, for instance.

For this reason it is not advised to utilise a CIPW norm on kimberlites, lamproites, lamprophyres and some silica-undersaturated igneous rocks. In the case of carbonatite, it is improper to use a CIPW norm upon a melt rich in carbonate.

It is possible to apply the CIPW norm to metamorphosed igneous rocks. The validity of the method holds as true for metamorphosed igneous rocks as any igneous rock, and in this case it is useful in deriving an assumed mineralogy from a rock that may have no remnant protolith mineralogy remaining.

== See also ==
- Geochemistry
- Mineralogy
- Wüstite
