= Streckeisen =

Streckeisen is a German surname. Notable people with the surname include:

- Adolf Streckeisen (1857–1916), Swiss academic and forensic physician
- Albert Streckeisen (1901–1998), Swiss petrologist, son of Adolf
