= Louis V. Pirsson =

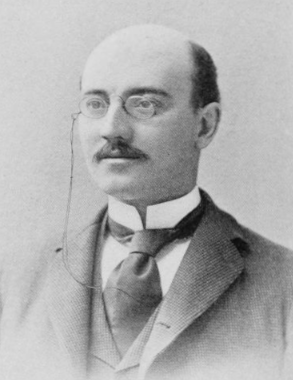
- Born: Louis Valentine Pirsson; November 3, 1860; Fordham, New York, US
- Died: December 8, 1919 (aged 59); New Haven, Connecticut, US
- Education: Sheffield Scientific School
- Occupations: Geologist, petrologist
- Spouse: Eliza Trumbull Brush (m. 1902)

Louis Valentine Pirsson (November 3, 1860 – December 8, 1919) was an American geologist and petrologist, best known for devising (with collaborators Charles Whitman Cross, Joseph Paxson Iddings, and Henry S. Washington) the CIPW norm for classifying igneous rocks. (He is the P in CIPW.) His 1915 Textbook of Geology was for decades the most widely used in the United States.

== Biography ==
Pirsson was born in Fordham, New York, to parents Francis Morris Pirsson and Louise M. (nee Butt) Pirsson. His mother died when he was four, and he was left in the care of cousins. When his foster parents left in 1869 for a journey lasting several years, the boy was left with a minister, from whom he received a classical education in mathematics, geography, Latin and ancient Greek. During this time he developed an interest in the natural sciences, particularly ornithology. From the age of 16 he attended a boarding school in Amenia, New York, whose principal was a Yale graduate. He was encouraged his student to continue his studies there.

Pirsson thus enrolled at Yale in 1879 in its Sheffield Scientific School. He graduated in 1882 with a degree in chemistry but continued there until 1887 has a laboratory assistant, with also some teaching duties. He was then appointed as a professor in analytical chemistry at the Brooklyn Polytechnic Institute (its first in that discipline). Unhappy with teaching the courses assigned to him, he resigned after one year. With a recommendation from George Jarvis Brush, the head of the Sheffield Scientific School, Pirsson joined the United States Geological Survey (USGS) as an assistant in an expedition to the Yellowstone National Park area led by Arnold Hughes. Pirsson was assigned to Joseph Paxson Iddings, to study the geology east of Yellowstone Lake . These field studies intensified his interest in geology, on which he focused on after now returning to New Haven, where he studied mineralogy, crystallography, and petrology under Samuel Lewis Penfield. Pirsson's first scientific work on the mineral mordenite appeared in 1890.

After another geological field season in Montana, Pirsson, supported by an inheritance, traveled in 1891 to Heidelberg and studied mineralogy for one semester with Karl Heinrich Rosenbusch. He then traveled to Paris for study with Alfred Lacroix. Here he came into contact with the most well-known mineralogists, petrographers and volcanologists of the time.

In the spring of 1892 Pirsson received an offer to teach mineralogy at the Sheffield Scientific School. He immediately accepted. From 1893 he taught courses in microscopy and the classification of igneous rocks. In the summer months he conducted field studies with USGS and discovered several new rock types, for example, shonkinite. In 1897 he was promoted to a full professor. In 1902 he married Eliza Trumbull Brush, daughter of the by-then former head of the Sheffield Scientific School. He died at his home in New Haven on December 8, 1919.

== CIPW Norm ==
Pirsson's intensive study of rock microscopy and petrography repeatedly raised problems in the classification of magmatic rocks, which at the time was often inconsistent. In 1899, the four petrologists Cross, Iddings, Piersson, and Washington met to develop a new classification based on quantitative chemical analysis. The idea was to develop a rigorously quantitative scheme that was independent of a rock's crystallization history (as it cooled) but that would reflect the characteristics of the assumed homogeneous melt from which it derived. Pirsson mediated among the different positions of his colleagues and brought the project to a successful conclusion. With its 1902 publication, the new scheme, named CIPW for the researchers' initials in alphabetical order, was immediately widely adopted.

== Membership in scientific societies ==
- Geological Society of America (1915 its Vice-President)
- Geological Society of Washington
- Connecticut Academy of Arts and Sciences
- American Academy of Arts and Sciences (elected 1917)
- American Philosophical Society
- Geologiska Föreningen in Stockholm.
- National Academy of Sciences (elected 1913)
- From 1899 until his death he was associate editor of the American Journal of Science

== Selected works ==
- "On the Monchiquites or Analcite Group of Igneous Rocks". In: J. Geol. 4, 1896, pp. 679–690.
- with W. Weed: "Geology and Mineral Resources of the Judith Mountains of Montana". In: U.S. Geol. Survey Ann. Rep. 18, Part 3, 1898, pp. 437–616.
- with W. Cross, JP Iddings and HS Washington: "A Quantitative Chemico-Mineralogical Classification and Nomenclature of Igneous Rocks". In: J. Geol. 10, 1902, pp. 555–690.
- with W. Cross, JP Iddings and HS Washington: Quantitative Classification of Igneous Rocks. University of Chicago Press, Chicago 1903.
- with W. Cross, JP Iddings, HS Washington and HJ Johnston-Lavis: "The Texture of Igneous Rocks". In: J. Geol. 14, 1906, pp. 692–707.
- Rocks and Rock Minerals: A Manual of the Elements of Petrology without the Use of the Microscope. John Wiley & Sons, New York 1908.
- "Geology of Bermuda Island: the Igneous Platform". In: Am. J.Sci. 4th ser., 38, 1914, pp. 189–206.
- "Geology of Bermuda Island: Petrology of the Lavas". In: Am. J.Sci. 4th ser., 38, 1914, pp. 331–344.
- "Rock Classification for Engineering Students". In: Econ. Geol. 14, 1919, pp. 264–266.
- A Textbook of Geology. Part I: Physical Geology. 2nd Edition. John Wiley and Sons, New York 1919.
