= Crossite =

Rare silicate mineral

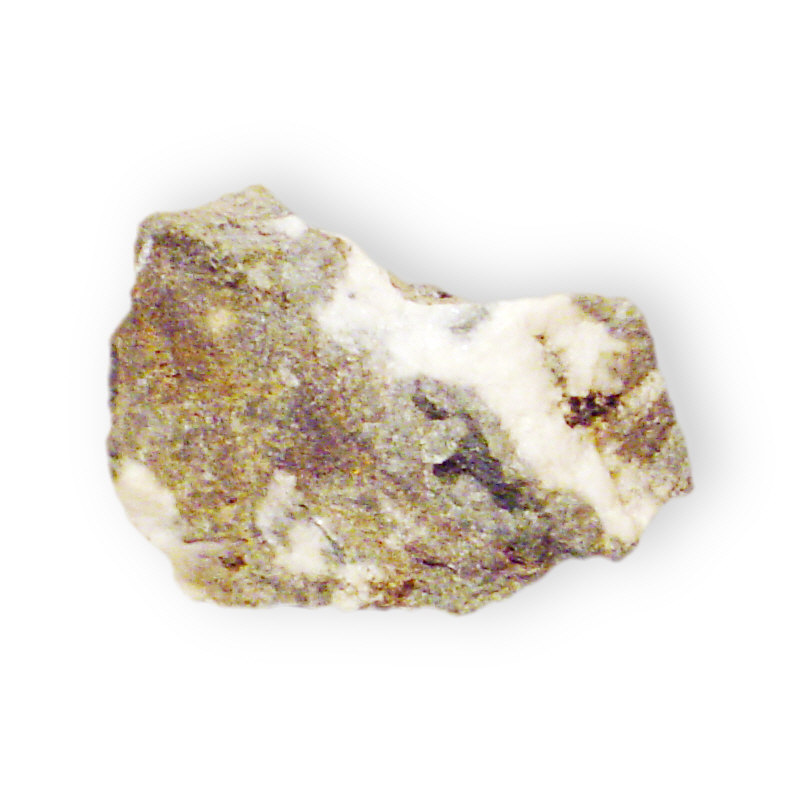
- Crossite from California

General
- Category: Amphibole – Inosilicates
- Formula: Na_{2}(Mg,Fe)_{3}(Al,Fe)_{2}Si_{8}O_{22}(OH)_{2}
- Crystal system: Monoclinic

Identification
- Color: blue, blue-green
- Mohs scale hardness: 6
- Luster: Vitreous
- Streak: light blue
- Diaphaneity: Transparent to translucent
- Specific gravity: 3.16
- Optical properties: Biaxial (-)

Crossite is an inosilicate double chain sodic amphibole and is a rare silicate mineral belonging to the riebeckite group. It is considered an intermediate between the amphiboles glaucophane and magnesioriebeckite, which form a series. IMA status: discredited 1997.

Crossite is named after Charles Whitman Cross, an American USGS petrologist.
