= Lopolith =

Lenticular igneous intrusion with a depressed central region

Basic types of intrusions: 1. Laccolith; 2. Small dike; 3. Batholith; 4. Dike; 5. Sill; 6. Volcanic neck, pipe; 7. Lopolith; As a general rule, in contrast to the smoldering volcanic vent in the figure, these names refer to the fully cooled and usually millions-of-years-old rock formations, which are the result of the underground magmatic activity shown.

A lopolith is a large igneous intrusion which is lenticular in shape with a depressed central region. Lopoliths are generally concordant with the intruded strata with dike or funnel-shaped feeder bodies below the body. The term was first defined and used by Frank Fitch Grout during the early 1900s in describing the Duluth gabbro complex in northern Minnesota and adjacent Ontario.

Lopoliths typically consist of large layered intrusions that range in age from Archean to Eocene. Examples include the Duluth gabbro, the Sudbury igneous complex of Ontario, the Bushveld igneous complex of South Africa, the Great Dyke in Zimbabwe, the Skaergaard complex of Greenland and the Humboldt lopolith of Nevada. The Sudbury occurrence has been attributed to an impact event and associated crustal melting.

== See also ==
- Laccolith
- Phacolith
- Batholith
