= Charles Whitman Cross =

American geologist (1854–1949)

- Born: September 1, 1854; Amherst, Massachusetts, U.S.
- Died: April 20, 1949 (aged 94); Chevy Chase, Maryland, U.S.
- Education: Amherst College; Leipzig University
- Scientific career
- Fields: Petrology
- Workplaces: United States Geological Survey
- Doctoral advisor: Ferdinand Zirkel

Charles Whitman Cross (September 1, 1854 – April 20, 1949) was an American geologist. He was educated at Amherst College, the University of Göttingen, and Leipzig University. A petrologist, much of his field work concerned rocks in Colorado. He and three other geologists proposed the CIPW norm that is still used in normative mineralogy. He was also active in scientific societies and institutions.

== Early life and education ==
Cross was born September 1, 1854, in Amherst, Massachusetts, (Note: Larsen, Montague, and Yoder say Amherst; Wilson says Southampton, Massachusetts.) to Maria Mason Cross and the Rev. Moses Kimball Cross. Later his family moved to Waverly, Iowa, where he graduated high school. In 1872 he entered the Scientific Course at Amherst College. After earning a Bachelor of Science degree in 1875, he remained at Amherst doing post-graduate studies in science. He attended the University of Göttingen from 1877 to 1878, when he transferred to Leipzig University. There he studied under Ferdinand Zirkel and earned his Ph.D. in 1880.

== Career ==
After completing his Ph.D., Cross returned to the United States and began a career with the U.S. Geological Survey that would last until his retirement in 1925. From 1880 to 1888 he was based in Denver, Colorado, after which he moved to Washington, D.C., where he headed the Survey's petrology section.

=== Research ===
Cross was a petrologist, and much of his field work focused on rocks. Most of this was done in Colorado, in rugged terrain with few roads. His greatest work was on the San Juan Mountains beginning in 1895. He also worked in the Leucite Hills of Wyoming and in Hawaii.

Besides his substantial field work, Cross was known for his pioneering research in normative mineralogy. Together with Joseph P. Iddings, Louis Valentine Pirsson, and Henry Stephens Washington, he devised a measurement of the chemical composition of rocks that came to be known as the CIPW norm, after their initials. Published in a 1903 book, their method was more quantitative than previous approaches and introduced a novel nomenclature system. While other petrologists generally judged their nomenclature to be too detailed and cumbersome, they embraced the quantitative approach of calculating a "norm" based on a rock's chemical composition, and the CIPW norm remains a staple of petrology.

=== Other professional activities ===
Cross helped organize the National Research Council. He was a member from 1918 to 1922, treasurer from 1918 to 1919, and vice chairman of its Division of Geology and Geography in 1918. He was among several geologists who persuaded the Carnegie Institution of Washington to establish its Geophysical Laboratory. In 1910 he organized the Petrologists' Club, whose first meetings took place in his home.

Cross was elected to the National Academy of Sciences in 1908 and was its treasurer from 1911 to 1919. he was elected to the American Philosophical Society in 1915. He was a member of the Geological Society of America and was its president in 1918. In 1925, his alma mater Amherst College awarded him an honorary Doctor of Sciences degree.

== Personal life ==
On November 7, 1895, Cross married Virginia Stevens, daughter of Moses T. Stevens. They had one child, a son.

== Death and legacy ==
Cross died April 20, 1949, in Chevy Chase, Maryland. At the time of his death he was the oldest member of the National Academy of Sciences and the oldest living alumnus of Amherst College.

Crossite is named in his honor.

== Bibliography ==
- Cross, Whitman; Iddings, Joseph P.; Pirsson, Louis V.; Washington, Henry S. (1903). Quantitative Classification of Igneous Rocks. University of Chicago Press.
