= Phacolith =

Lens-shaped igneous intrusion

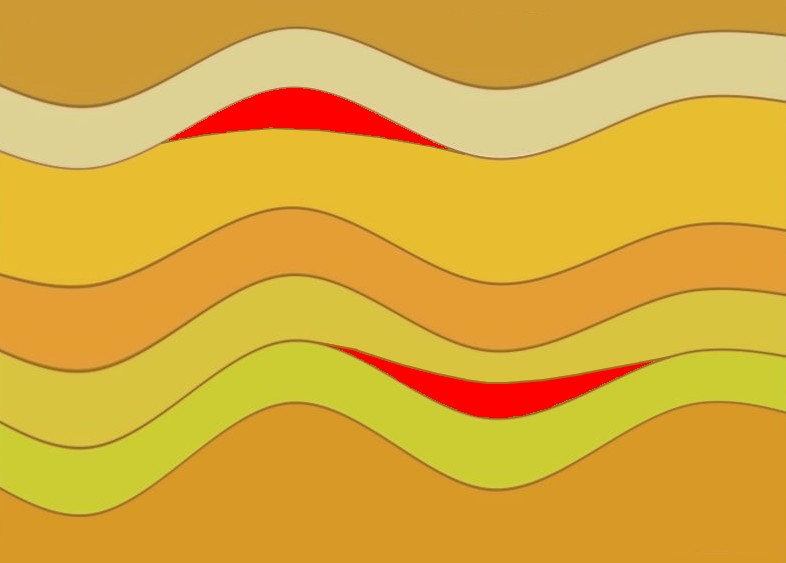
Cross-sectional diagram of phacoliths (red) in older folded rocks

A phacolith is a pluton of igneous rock parallel to the bedding plane or foliation of folded country rock. More specifically, it is a typically lens-shaped pluton that occupies either the crest of an anticline or the trough of a syncline. In rare cases the body may extend as a sill from the crest of an anticline through the trough of an adjacent syncline, such that in cross section it has an S shape. In intensely folded terrain the hinge of folds would be areas of reduced pressure and thus potential sites for magma migration and emplacement.

The term was coined and initially defined by Alfred Harker in his The Natural History of Igneous Rocks in 1909.

== Examples ==
- in the Franklin and Hamburg areas of Sussex County, New Jersey, United States
- the Omey pluton in Ireland
- near Bayalan, Ajmer district, Rajasthan in India
- Corndon Hill, in Shropshire, England, United Kingdom

== See also ==
- Laccolith
- Lopolith
- Batholith
