= Mary G. Keyes =

American scientist

- Born: Mary Gertrude Keyes; February 24, 1904; Luray, Virginia, U.S.
- Died: May 8, 1984 (age 80); Riverside, California, U.S.
- Occupations: Government researcher, chemist

Mary Gertrude Keyes (February 24, 1904 – May 8, 1984) was an American musician and research chemist based in Washington, D.C., and later in Riverside, California. She co-wrote papers with geologist Henry Stephens Washington in the 1920s.

== Early life and education ==
Keyes was born in Luray, Virginia, the daughter of Charles Wesley Keyes and Mary Ela Zerkel Keyes. Her father was an accountant, and her mother was a singer. Her grandfather Lemuel Zerkel was superintendent of Luray Caverns, and her uncle Lemuel F. Zerkel was U.S. Park Commissioner at Shenandoah National Park. Keyes studied violin and her sister Elizabeth trained as a harpist; the sisters performed as a chamber music ensemble in the 1920s, and gave radio concerts together.

== Career ==
Keyes worked in the Petrographic Laboratory the United States Geological Survey as a young woman, preparing thin sections of rock samples for analysis. She assisted Henry Stephens Washington in the geophysical laboratory of the Carnegie Institution for Science in Washington in the 1920s. In addition to her work with Washington, Keyes analyzed samples for Reginald Aldworth Daly's "The Geology of Saint Helena Island" (1927), Bailey Willis's Studies in Comparative Seismology: Earthquake Conditions in Chile (1929) and other reports.

In the 1940s Keyes was a scientific aide in the Division of Soil Chemistry and Physics in the United States Department of Agriculture. After World War II, she was a soil chemist on the staff of the Rubidoux Laboratory in Riverside, California. She trained visiting agricultural scientists on techniques of water analysis, through a program supported by UNESCO.

== Publications ==
- "Making thin sections of rocks" (1925)
- "The Lavas of Etna" (1926, with Henry S. Washington and M. Aurousseau)
- "Rocks of Eastern China" (1926, with Henry S. Washington)
- "Petrology of the Hawaiian Islands V: The Leeward Islands" (1926, with Henry S. Washington)
- "Rocks of the Galápagos Islands" (1927, with Henry S. Washington)
- "Petrology of the Hawaiian Islands VI: Maui" (1928, with Henry S. Washington)
- "Soluble material of soils in relation to their classification and general fertility" (1942, with Myron Sallee Anderson and George W. Cromer)
- "Extraction of Auxin from Virgin Soils" (1942, with William S. Stewart and Myron Sallee Anderson)
- "An Index of the Tendency of CaCO_{3} to Precipitate from Irrigation Waters" (1965, with C. A. Bowers, L. V. Wilcox, and G. W. Akin)

== Personal life ==
Keyes moved to California with Eleanor Hall in the mid-1940s. She died in 1984, at the age of 80, in Riverside, California, survived by her sister, Elizabeth Keyes Loewenstein. Her nephew Jared Loewenstein was a librarian at the University of Virginia, known for building the school's collection of Jorge Luis Borges materials. Her other nephew, Peter J. Loewenstein, was a vice president at National Public Radio.
