= Albert Streckeisen =

Swiss petrographer and petrologist

Streckeisen in Venice, 1979

Albert Streckeisen (Basel, 8 November 1901 – Bern, 29 September 1998) was a Swiss petrographer and petrologist, the son of Basel forensic scientist Adolf Streckeisen.

== Biography ==
He studied geology, mineralogy and petrology in Basel, Zürich and Bern. He submitted his doctoral thesis on the geology and petrology of the Flüela group in 1927. In the same year, aged 26, he was called as Professor in Mineralogy and Petrology to the Politehnica University of Bucharest, Romania. As a member of the Romanian Geological Service, he was active in the geological mapping of the Carpathians.

In the 1930s, he returned to Switzerland because he would have been forced to relinquish his Swiss nationality in order to remain professor at Bucharest. He taught science at Swiss high schools until his retirement in Bern. He became an honorary professorial associate at the University of Bern in 1942, where he was nominated extraordinary professor.

In 1958, Streckeisen was asked to collaborate in revising Paul Niggli's Tabellen zur Petrographie und zum Gesteinbestimmen "Tables for Petrography and Rock Determination". He noted significant problems with the current classification systems for igneous rocks. He wrote a review article and invited petrologists to send in their comments. This led to the formation of the Subcommission of the Systematics of Igneous Rocks, under the IUGS Commission on Petrology in 1970. The QAPF diagram for the classification of igneous rocks is also known as "Streckeisen diagram" in his honour. He began his work on igneous rocks aged over 60, pursuing it for more than 35 years until his death in October 1998. He received the Abraham-Gottlob-Werner medal of the Deutsche Mineralogische Gesellschaft in 1984.

== Bibliography ==
- 1962 Minerale und Gesteine
