= Adolf Streckeisen =

Swiss physician and professor (1857-1916)

Adolf Streckeisen (28 July 1857 – 28 December 1916) was professor of medicine at Basel University, first forensic physician (Gerichtsarzt) of Basel (a post created in 1895) and president of the Basel Mission.

He was the father of geologist Albert Streckeisen.
