= Joseph P. Iddings =

American geologist and petrologist

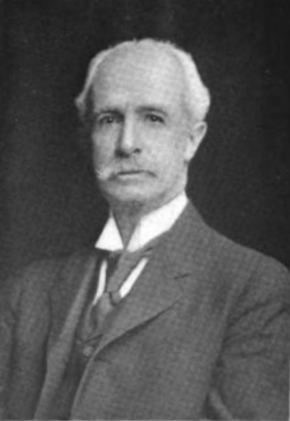
- Born: Joseph Paxson Iddings; January 21, 1857; Baltimore, Maryland
- Died: September 8, 1920 (aged 63); Sandy Spring, Maryland
- Education: Sheffield Scientific School; Columbia University; University of Heidelberg
- Occupation(s): Geologist, petrologist

Joseph Paxson Iddings (January 21, 1857 – September 8, 1920) was an American geologist and petrologist.

== Biography ==
Joseph Paxson Iddings was born in Baltimore, Maryland on January 21, 1857, the son of a wholesaler in Philadelphia. He received a master's degree from Yale College's Sheffield Scientific School in 1877 and then studied analytical chemistry at the University. Later, he transferred to Columbia University where he studied Geology under Professor John S. Newberry. He spent 1879-1880 at the University of Heidelberg, where he conducted petrographic research under the direction of Karl Rosenbusch.

From July 1880 to 1895, he worked in the United States Geological Survey.

Beginning in 1892, he lectured at the University of Chicago, where a Department of Petrology, the first of its kind in the world, was created especially for him. In 1908, he left the University and retired to his country house in Maryland, conducting his own research. He died unmarried and childless at his home in Sandy Spring, Maryland on September 8, 1920, from chronic nephritis.

== Legacy ==
The National Academies Press called Iddings "an outstanding leader of petrology". The New York Times called him "a distinguished petrologist". Iddings was a member of the National Academy of Sciences, a member of the Geological Society of London, the American Philosophical Society, a fellow of the Geological Society of America, a member of the Scientific Society of Christiania, an honorary member of the Société française de minéralogie et de cristallographie, an honorary curator of petrology in the U.S. National Museum. Yale University established Iddings Scholarship for Graduate Studies.

The mineral iddingsite was named after him.
