= Henry Stephens Washington =

American geologist

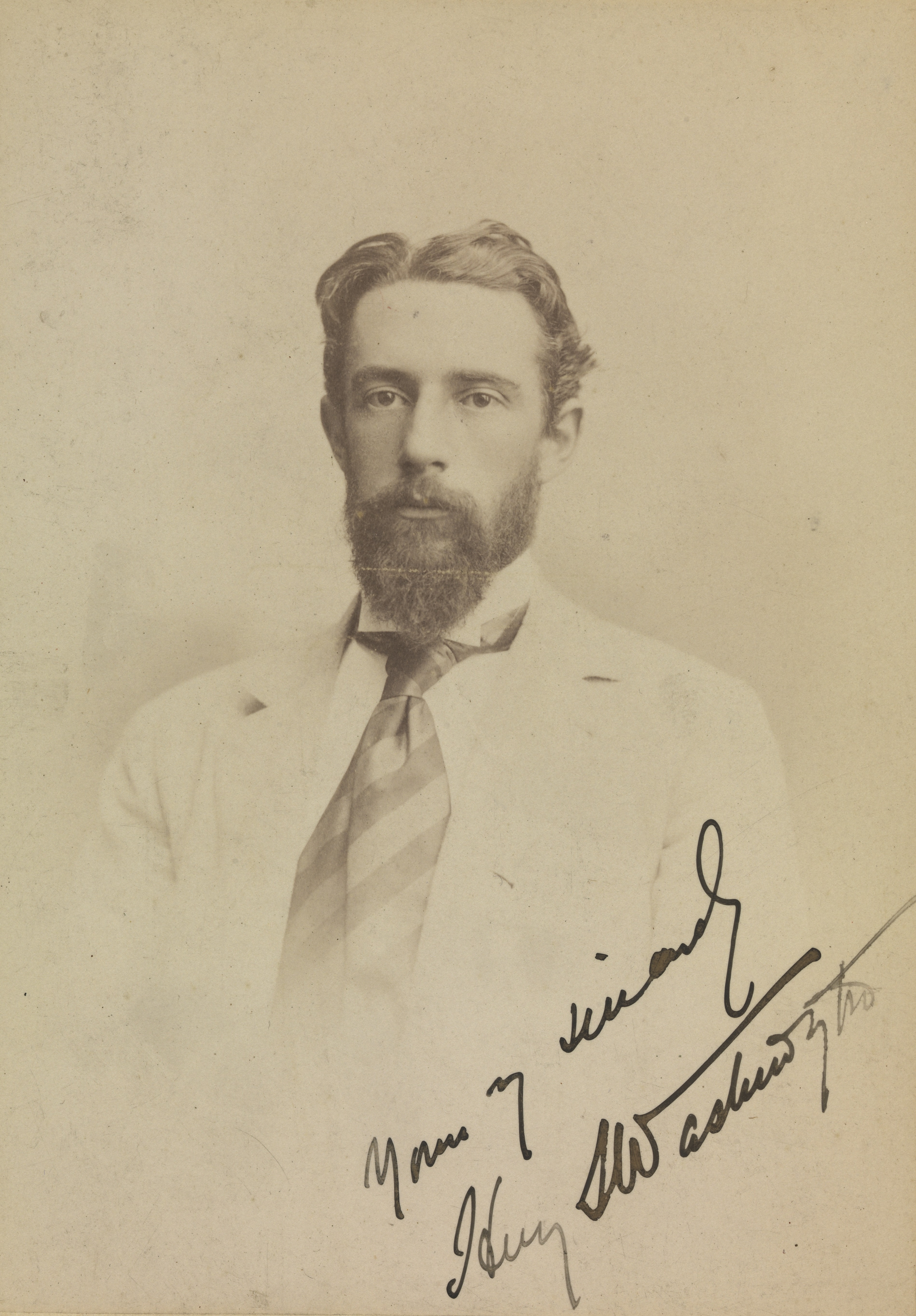
Henry Stephens Washington

Henry Stephens Washington (January 15, 1867 – January 7, 1934) was an American geologist.

== Biography ==
Washington was born in Newark, New Jersey on January 15, 1867. He attended Yale University, graduating in 1886, and took his masters there two years later. He received his Ph.D. at the University of Leipzig in 1893. He also studied at the American School for Classical Studies in Athens, Greece. His research included trips to Greece, Asia Minor, Italy, Spain, Brazil and the Hawaiian islands. By 1920 he was a consulting mining geologist of high reputation.

== Works ==
His works include:

- Chemical Analyses of Igneous Rocks (1903)
- Manual of the Chemical Analysis of Rocks (1904; 2d ed., 1910)
- The Roman Cogmatic Region (1907)
- "The Lavas of Etna" (1926, with M. Aurousseau and Mary G. Keyes)
- "Rocks of Eastern China" (1926, with Mary G. Keyes)
- "Petrology of the Hawaiian Islands V: The Leeward Islands" (1926, with Mary G. Keyes)
- "Rocks of the Galápagos Islands" (1927, with Mary G. Keyes)
- "Petrology of the Hawaiian Islands VI: Maui" (1928, with Mary G. Keyes)
