= Chantiers de la jeunesse =

Paramilitary youth organization in Vichy France

The Chantiers de la jeunesse française (French; lit. 'Worksites of the French Youth') or CJF was a paramilitary organization active in Vichy France from 1940 to 1944. A place for the training and supervision of French youth, it was imbued with the values of the Révolution nationale promoted by the Vichy government.

== History ==
=== Creation and objectives ===
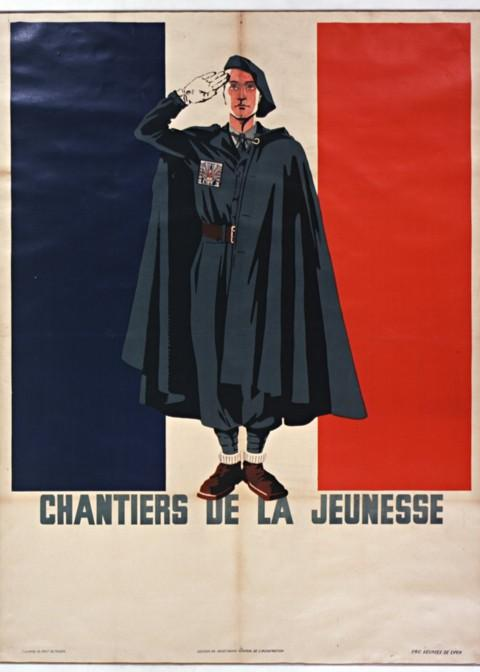
Poster for the Youth Work Camps of 1941.

Following the Armistice of 22 June 1940, which abolished mandatory military service, the youth work camps were established in its place on 30. Young men in the free zone and French North Africa of conscription age (20 years) were enrolled for a six-month training period. They lived in camps close to nature, similar to scouts, with the significant difference that participation was not voluntary, and they performed public works, particularly forestry tasks, in a military atmosphere. They were supervised by active and reserve officers and non-commissioned officers demobilized after the war of 1939–1940, as well as by aspirants trained during that conflict. Starting in 1941, the obligation to serve in the youth work camps was extended from six to eight months.

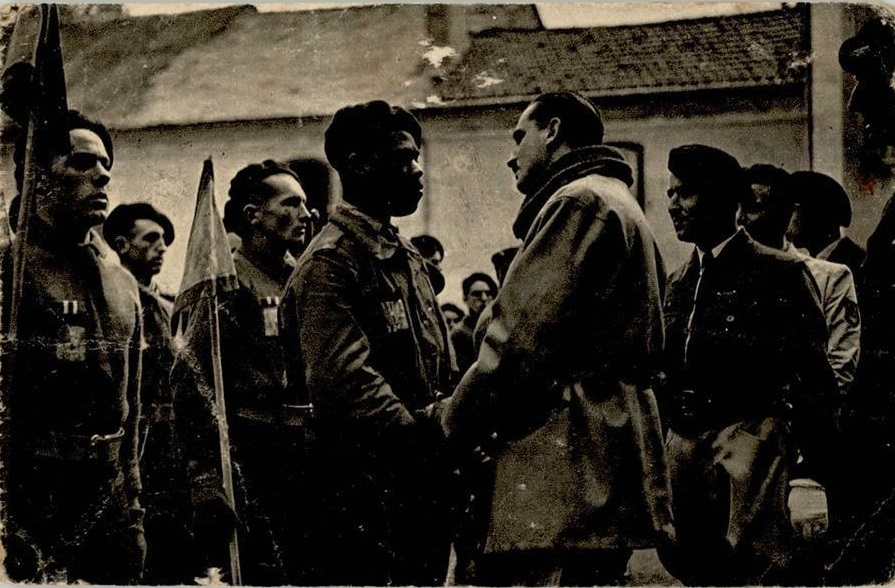
Georges Lamirand in a French youth work camp. Propaganda postcard of the Vichy regime.

Led by General Joseph de La Porte du Theil, the youth work camps were an ambiguous institution. Their purpose was to instill the values of the Révolution nationale, advocated by the Vichy regime. For the general, “moral training is to be sought primarily in the cult of honor and the practice of communal living; virile training, which also creates a favorable predisposition for moral development, is tied to physical exercise”. The incorporation of norms was thus achieved through exercise. “Knowing how to carry oneself is a precept of moral dignity, but it requires mastery of the body. The slovenliness, indiscipline, and laziness of 1940 France were both moral and physical. You cannot wage war with a people who do not know how to carry themselves and lack muscles”. Scouting, Hébertism, sports, and games were thus intended to serve a broader ideological project in which training in discipline, authority, and obedience contributed to the country’s “rejuvenation”.

Initially open to Jewish leaders and youth, the camps were closed to them in 1941 in North Africa at the request of Lieutenant-Colonel Van Hecke, regional commissioner, supported by General de La Porte du Theil. The exclusion was extended to mainland France in the second half of 1942. The cult of hierarchy and discipline was particularly evident in the emphasis placed on leadership at all levels. The veneration of Marshal Philippe Pétain deeply influenced the leadership. While the regime exalted a return to the land and provincialism, life in woodland groups was also seen as a reaction against the industrial city, considered corrupting, a breeding ground for individualism and class struggle. No “political” activity was tolerated in the camps. This meant a ban on propaganda from Resistance organizations, as well as collaborationist parties, and the absence of radios, debates, or other means of communication that, even if censored, would have allowed the youth to follow the evolution of the war and the regime’s politics and form their own opinions.

=== Critics and defenders ===
It was not uncommon after the war for former camp leaders to claim they had sought to prepare a force that could be mobilized in case of renewed conflict with Germany. Events in North Africa lent credence to this claim, where former camp members, after the Allied landings on 8 November 1942, were recalled, trained, and assigned to various units of the Army of Africa. They participated in the campaigns of Tunisia, Italy, France and Germany from 1943 to 1945, the most notable being the 7th Regiment of African Chasseurs under Lieutenant-Colonel Alphonse S. Van Hecke, to whom Le Chant des Africains was dedicated in 1943.

Critics of the work camps point out:

- The active involvement of the camps in sending 16,000 youths to the Compulsory Labor Service (STO) in Germany, with the camp leadership doing nothing to oppose these transfers;
- The camp leaders did not reject the ideas of the “Révolution nationale,” instead ensuring its dissemination across all groups; the leaders and instructors appeared to be convinced and disciplined “Vichysts,” antisemitic, anti-Freemason, anti-leftist parties of the time, and opposed to the core ideas of the Third Republic;
- The “resistance myth” of the work camps was not supported by the camp leadership as an organization, which remained loyal to Vichy (except in North Africa after November 1942 and the Allied landings). While some individuals from the camps joined the Resistance, they did so independently, not as part of the organization;
- Neither at the start of the camps (in 1941/42) nor after the Allied landings in North Africa or the victory at Stalingrad (February 1943) did camp leaders call on youths to join the Resistance. The thesis and book by Christophe Pécout thoroughly analyze this resistance myth;
- General La Porte du Theil chose to return from North Africa in November at the time of the Anglo-American landings, rather than joining the Allied side as did Vichy armistice army officers led by Darlan and Giraud.

Defenders of the work camps highlight (beyond the militarization of North African camps):

- Sabotage of departures for the Compulsory Labor Service (STO) in Germany in some groups (notably in the Alps);
- The support for youths sent from the camps to the STO in Germany under the “Chantier Mission in Germany,” with several dozen young camp leaders volunteering to accompany and supervise them (see the case of Georges Toupet below);
- The spirit of revenge among the leadership, particularly Lieutenant-Colonel Van Hecke’s involvement in the “group of five” to facilitate the Allied landing in North Africa;
- A concealment effort: hiding young Alsatians (refractory to conscription in the German army) by providing them with false identities; concealing some armistice army equipment;
- The sense of responsibility of La Porte du Theil, returning from North Africa on 10 to oversee approximately 70,000 youths in the camps in mainland France;
- The existence of secret reports by M. de Brinon, Vichy government delegate in Paris, addressed to Pierre Laval, harshly criticizing the camps for their lack of loyalty to the government and their anti-German sentiments.

When they invaded the southern zone, the Germans ordered the Vichy government to disband the Armistice Army on 27 November 1942 but, divided on the issue, chose to maintain the work camps. However, they significantly altered their locations starting in March: groups in Provence, the Pyrenees, and the Alps were relocated to the Massif Central, Dordogne, and Landes, respectively. The occupiers feared their potential support for an Allied landing via the Mediterranean (Provence groups), assistance in escapes via Spain (Pyrenees groups), or aid to the maquis (Alps groups). On 20, the Wehrmacht conducted forceful inspections in three-quarters of the camp groups.

Many former camp members joined the French Resistance, while others went to North Africa. The camps’ stocks of food and clothing were frequent targets for the maquis, who were often in dire need. Numerous raids, sometimes with complicity from within, allowed maquisards to seize these supplies. This explains why many photographs show maquisards dressed in youth work camp uniforms, which were not originally intended for such use.

=== General de La Porte du Theil ===
Starting in September, General La Porte du Theil, facing new German demands that would have amounted to sending nearly all remaining camp members to Germany, categorically refused any further provision for the occupier (prompting the Wehrmacht’s forceful inspections). However, he also declined invitations from the Resistance to join them or to go to Algiers to continue the fight alongside the Anglo-Saxons after their landing on 8 November 1942.

Warned of an imminent arrest at the end of December, he also refused to flee. Removed by a Vichy government decree at the beginning of January 1944, he was arrested on 4 at his office in Châtel-Guyon by the Germans and taken to Germany, first interned in Munich, then in Austria, where he was liberated by a French army detachment on 4 May 1945 and returned to French territory.

His activities before his arrest and internment in Germany were investigated by a commission of the High Court of Justice starting in July 1945. This investigation led to a dismissal of charges in 1947. Four main reasons explain this decision:

- The youth work camps acted as a shield for youth against German or collaborationist influences;
- Despite testimonies from about a hundred former group leaders subordinate to the accused, it was not established that General de La Porte du Theil served the occupier’s interests with zeal; his consistently anti-German stance was even confirmed;
- General de La Porte du Theil categorically refused to send or provide camp members to the occupier starting in September;
- Former camp members participated in large numbers in the Liberation battles of 1944–1945: 38,000 from North Africa, 60,000 voluntary enlistees from mainland France between June and September 1944, and 100,000 youths from the 1943 class mobilized starting in January.

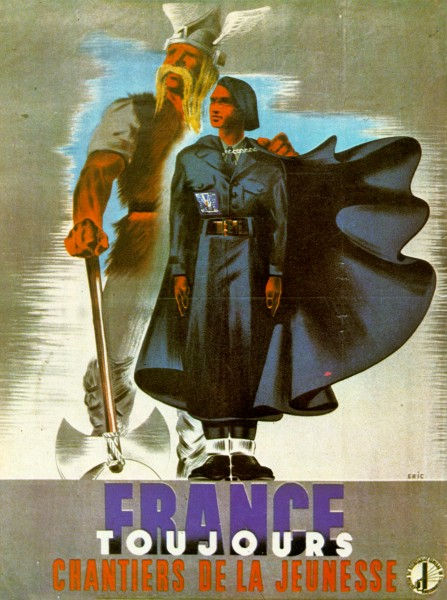
Poster for the Youth Work Camps.

=== Germany ===
Under the law on the Compulsory Labor Service (STO), which applied to young men born in 1920, 1921, and 1922, the work camps mobilized the class called up in November, totaling 32,000 young Frenchmen. 16,000 of them were actually sent to Germany (National Archives [file F60 1452, for example]). Of the remaining 16,000 camp youths who did not go to Germany, 7,000 disappeared, sometimes with the assistance of group leaders (notably in the Alpes-Jura province), and 9,000 were assigned to compulsory labor in France.

In Germany, many requisitioned camp leaders accompanied their youths. Some volunteered to supervise them on-site, with the groups remaining intact. Until 1945, practices of the discredited Révolution nationale persisted in occupied and then liberated France: the cult of the Marshal, collective patriotic ceremonies such as flag-raising or “facing west,” etc. Having reissued uniforms to their demobilized youths, leaders had young Frenchmen marching in German streets in uniform, in ranks, with banners unfurled, sometimes led by music.

These same leaders, while mostly remaining steadfastly Pétainist, also countered the propaganda of extreme collaborationists, for example, by dissuading STO youths from enlisting in the Waffen SS. They also fought to improve living conditions in civilian worker camps.

The most well-known experience was that led by the young leader Georges Toupet in Silesia. Aged around 25, he managed to take charge of a chaotic camp housing 2,500 French workers, located near the Auschwitz-Birkenau extermination complex. He and his deputies combated neglect, lack of hygiene, alcoholism, and prostitution, promoting a cultured, sporting, and educational life. Simultaneously, Toupet participated in an escape network for prisoners of war and an Allied intelligence network, providing information about the nearby death camp.

While the Germans initially appreciated the discipline and efficient organization of the work camps, which helped maintain order among thousands of exiled forced laborers, relations gradually deteriorated. In total, of nearly 200 camp leaders present in the Reich, about thirty paid with their lives for proven acts of resistance; roughly the same number endured prolonged arrests or deportation to concentration camps, from which some did not return.

As for the youths sent to Germany by the camps, many, while not necessarily forgiving the institution for delivering them to the STO, acknowledged they were not abandoned in Germany. Group life, the prestige of the uniform, and discipline also offered them some advantages.

== Organization ==
To avoid appearing as a military organization to the occupier, the work camps were placed under the authority of the State Secretariat for National Education and Youth. After the arrest of La Porte du Theil, the camps came under the control of the Minister of Labor and Industrial Production, Jean Bichelonne, a collaborationist responsible for implementing the Compulsory Labor Service. This change intensified their transformation into a labor pool for the occupier, both in France and Germany.

The General Commissariat coordinated regional commissariats. Each regional commissariat oversaw a leadership school and 8 to 10 groups, comparable to regiments, with 1,500 to 2,200 men. Each group was divided into 6 to 12 teams, comparable to companies of 150 to 200 men each. Teams were subdivided into squads.

=== General Commissariat ===
Based in Châtel-Guyon (Puy-de-Dôme) at the “Splendid Hôtel,” it was dissolved on 17. Until then, it consisted of:

- The cabinet;
- The 1st section: organization, command, social services;
- The 2nd section: personnel, staffing, and disputes;
- The 3rd section: education;
- The 4th section: budget;
- The 5th section: works;
- The 6th section: health;
- The 7th section: transport and meetings;
- Internal services and chaplaincy;
- Vichy liaison;
- Occupied zone;
- Administrative school;
- Women’s social school;
- The CJF equestrian establishment in Chamberet (Corrèze), created in March and dissolved on 24;
- General medical supply store;
- The CJF national band, created in March and dissolved in July.
- Group #42 “La Marne,” based in Châtel-Guyon (Puy-de-Dôme). Dissolved on 30. Motto: “Forward, boldly”. Publication: Au cœur des chantiers.

=== Regional Commissariats ===
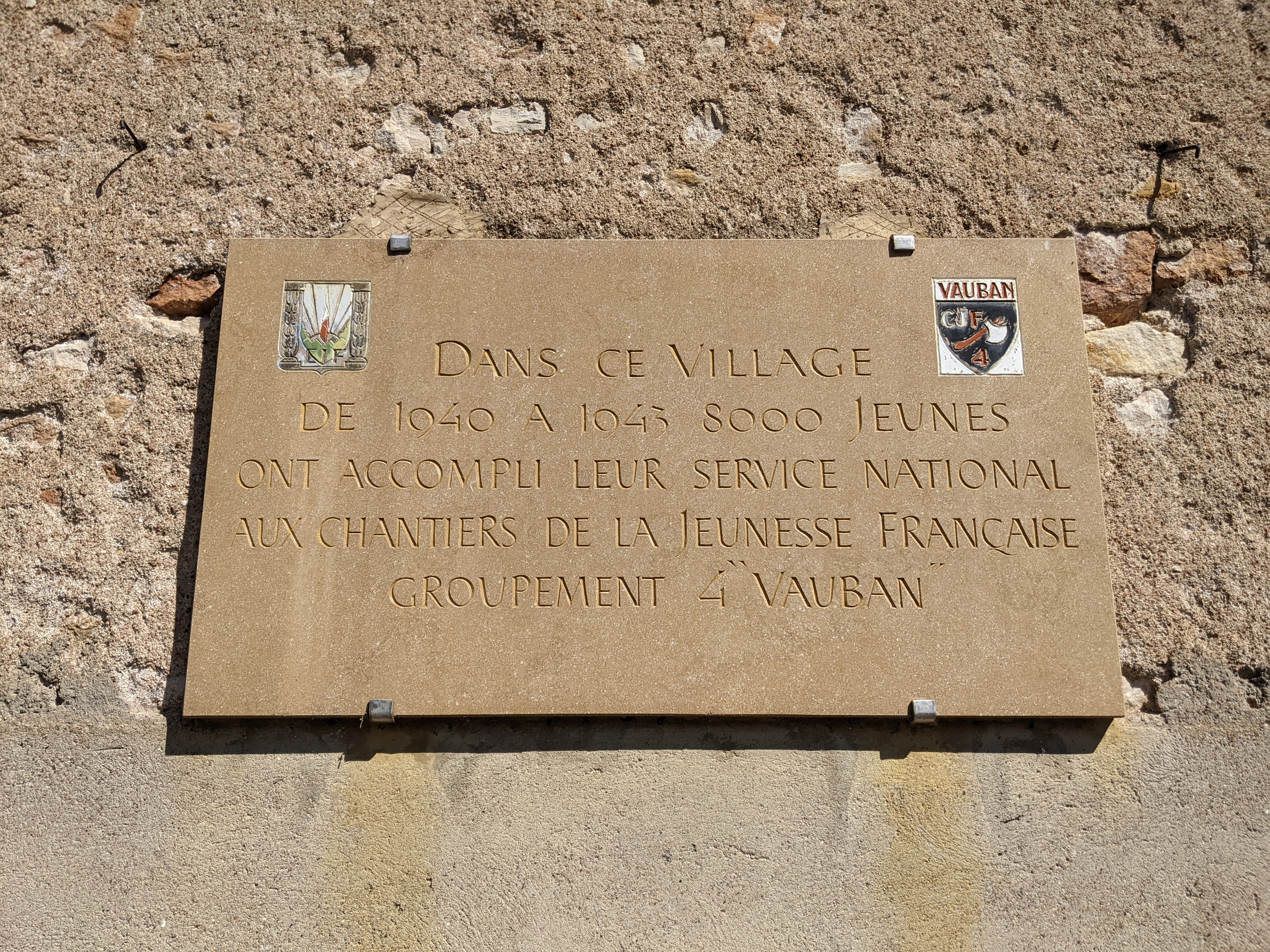
Plaque in honor of Group #4 Vauban in Cormatin.

Regional Commissariat for the Alpes-Jura Province

- Regional Commissariat, based in Lyon (Rhône). Motto: “Face forward”. Publication: Jeunesse des Alpes et du Jura
- Regional Leadership School named Psichari, based in Collonges-au-Mont-d'Or (Rhône). Motto: “Believe, love, serve”. Classes: “Alain de Fayolle” class from 15 to 25 – “Desplat” class from 8 to 24 – “Roland-Morillot” class from 15 to 23 – “Marquis-de-Morès” class from February to 30 – a fifth class planned for October never materialized, as the Germans demanded the school’s closure.

The province included, at its creation, the following camps:

- Group #2 “Jehan-de-Vienne,” based in Crotenay (Jura). Dissolved on 30. Motto: “Comtois, surrender? Never, by my faith”. Publication: En flèche. Teams: 1/ “France” then “France First,” 2/ Sioux Team, then Kayak Team, 3/ “The Captains,” 4/ Great Winds Team, 5/ “Of the French Empire,” then Charles de Foucauld, then “Colonial Empire,” 6/ “Cluny,” 7/ “Of the Mountain” then “The Builders,” and again “Of the Mountain,” 8/ non-existent?, 9/ “Knight d’Assas” also called “Sources Team,” 10/ “Of the Navy,” 11/ “Of Ardent Youth.”
- Group #3 “Bournazel,” based in Bourg (Ain). Dissolved on 30. Motto: “Straight to the goal”. Publication: Chanteclerc. Teams: 1/ Laperrine, 2/ Gouraud, 3/ Bugeaud, 4/ Faidherbe, 5/ De Brazza, 6/ De Foucauld, 7/ Lyautey, 8/ Gallieni, 9/ La Pérouse, 10/ René Caillé, Direction Team: Marchand.
- Group #4 “Vauban,” based in Cormatin (Saône-et-Loire), then in Paray-le-Monial (Saône-et-Loire) in October–November. Dissolved on 30. Motto: “Sweat spares blood”. Publication: Vauban. Teams: 1/ Briançon, 2/ Brest, 3/ Verdun, 4/ Bayonne, 5/ Dunkerque, 6/ Toulon, 7/ Metz, 8/ Strasbourg, 9/ Douai, 10/ Lille, Direction Team: Belfort.
- Group #7 “Le Fier,” based in Rumilly (Haute-Savoie). Created on 17, dissolved on 9. Motto: “France must endure”. Publication: L’écho du Clergeon (#1 on 18) then Le Fier from 1941. Teams: 1/ Le Regain, 2/ Grand Nord, 3/ Hurlevent, 4/ La Remonte, 5/ Le Dru, 6/ L’Effort, 7/ Sur le Rocher, 8/ Le Hardi, 9/ Le Renouveau, 10/ L’Élan, 11/ L’Espoir.
- Group #8 “La Relève,” based in Le Châtelard (Savoie), then in Captieux (Gironde) in October–November. Created in September, assigned to industrial production on 1. Motto: “France, arise!”. Publication: Court-circuit. Teams: 1/ Lyautey, 2/ Roland, 3/ Bayard, 4/ Mermoz, 5/ De Bournazel, 6/ Guynemer, 7/ Charcot, 8/ Saint Georges, 9/ Les Aigles, 10/ Du Plessis, 11/ Colbert.
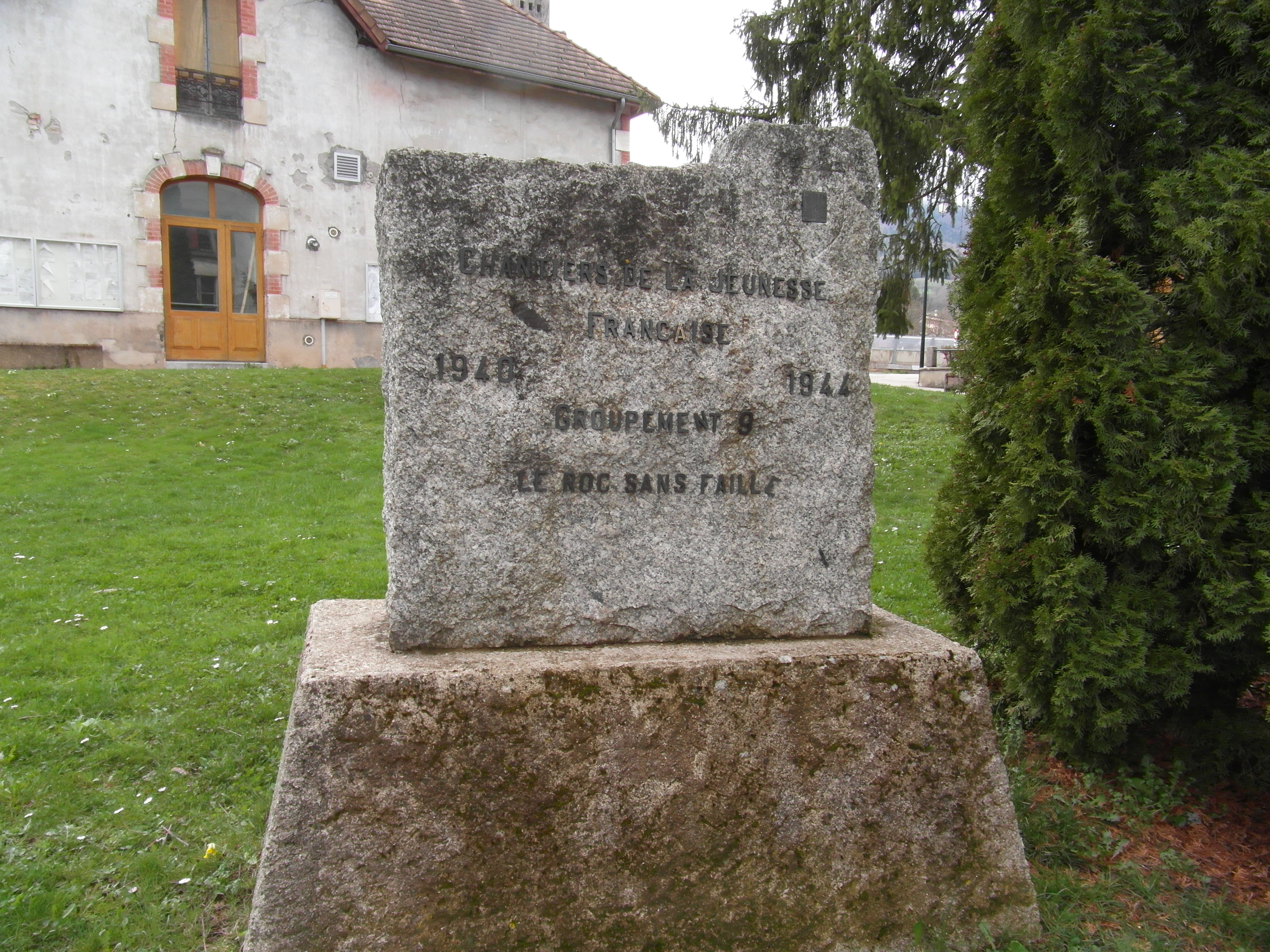
- Monument to Group 9 erected in Monestier-de-Clermont.
  Group #9 “Le Roc,” based in Monestier-de-Clermont (Isère), then in Saint-Magne (Gironde) in October–November. Created on 15, assigned to industrial production on 1. Motto: “Without fail”. Publication: Le Roc. Teams: 1/ Roland, 2/ Montcalm, 3/ Rivière-Atlantic South, 4/ De Foucault, 5/ Lyautey-Lorraine, 6/ Du Guesclin, 7/ Bournazel, 8/ Bayard, 9/ Turenne, 10/ Saint Louis, 11/ Mangin.
- Group #10 “La Grande-Chartreuse,” based in Saint-Laurent-du-Pont (Isère), then in Sore (Landes) in October–November. Created in August, assigned to industrial production on 1. Motto: “For France, wholeheartedly”. Publication: La cognée. Teams: 1/ Le Billon, 2/ Chartrousette, 3/ La Ruchère, 4/ Malamille, 5/ Brevardière, 6/ Perquelin, 7/ Les Échelles, 8/ Miribel, 9/ Marfay, 10/ Fourvoirie then Curière, 11/ Saint-Laurent-du-Pont, SES. These names correspond to the teams’ locations.
- Group #11 “Vercors,” based in Villard-de-Lans (Isère). Dissolved on 30. Motto: “Face forward”. Publication: Faire face. Teams: 1/?, 2/?, 3/?, 4/?, 5/?, 6/?, 7/ Le Peuil, 8/?, 9/?, 10/?, 11/? Variants: Team 7 Le Peuil exists in two Paquet de Grenoble versions: one with a flat back, one with a “stamped” back.
- Group #12 “Belledonne,” based in Saint-Martin-d'Uriage (Isère), then Vizille and Moustey (Landes) in October–November. Created on 7, assigned to industrial production on 1. Motto: “Through honor’s strength”. Publication: La cordée. Teams: 1/ De Foucault, 2/ Foch, 3/ Mermoz, 4/ Guynemer, 5/ Sidi Brahim, 6/ Jean de Vienne, 7/ Lyautey, 8/ Le Chamois, 9/ De Freydière, 10/ Point du Jour, 11/ Le Chardon.
- Group #43 “Sidi-Brahim,” based in Artemare (Ain), then Toctoucau (Gironde) in October–November. Created on 1, assigned to industrial production on 1 at the Saint-Médard-en-Jalles powder magazine (Gironde). Motto: “Grit your teeth”. Publication: Le téméraire. Teams: 1/ Général Dosse, 2/ Général Béjart, 3/ Montvernier, 4/ Général Touchon, 5/ Général Gratier, 6/ Général Cartier, 7/ Dunkirk, 8/ Colonel Driant, 9/ Narvik, 10/ Lieutenant de Labaume, Leadership School / École de Foucault.

Regional Commissariat for the Auvergne Province

- Regional Commissariat, based in Clermont-Ferrand (Puy-de-Dôme). Motto: “To me, Auvergne; for France, higher”. Publication: L’Aiguillon
- Regional Leadership School, based in Theix near Saint-Genès-Champanelle (Puy-de-Dôme), opened in March. Motto: “Fides Intrepida” (“Fearless faith”). Classes: “Maréchal-Lyautey” class from 31 to 17 – “Amiral-Darlan” class from 28 to 27 – “Général-Weygand” class from 5 to 28 – “Maréchal-Foch” class from 26 to 15 – “Le Flambeau” class from 26 to 23 – “Verdun” class from 2 to 23 – “Général-Laperrine” class from 17 to 9 – “Les Plaideurs” class from January to 14.

The province included, at its creation, the following camps:

- Group #1 “Maréchal Pétain,” based in Tronçais Forest (Allier). Created on 25, dissolved on 9, assigned to industrial production. Motto: “Take a bold stance”. Publication: Bulletin du groupement 1. Teams: 1/ Alsace Lorraine, 2/ Lyautey, 3/ De Foucault, 4/ Jehanne d’Arc, 5/ Vercingétorix, 6/ Galliéni, 7/ Bayard, 8/ Faidherbe, 9/ Chamignoux Team, 10/ Bonaparte, 11/ Foch.
- Group #5 “Lyautey,” based in Pontgibaud (Puy-de-Dôme). Dissolved on 30. Motto: “Build”. Publication: France, ralliement. Teams: 1/ Péguy (1st contingent) then Jeanne d’Arc, 2/ Charcot, 3/ Bayard, 4/ Guynemer, 5/ De Bournazel, 6/ Verdun, 7/ Francis Garnier, 8/ Gouraud, 9/ Du Plessis, 10/ Jean Bart, 11/ Sidi Brahim (Direction Team).
- Group #20 “Turenne,” based in Lapleau (Corrèze), then Le Ripault (Indre-et-Loire) in September–October. Created in October, dissolved on 30. Motto: “With loyalty, serve”. Publication: Servir. Teams: 1/ Weygand, 2/ Jeanne d’Arc, 3/ Chevalier d’Assas then La Tour d’Auvergne, 4/ Sully, 5/ Charcot, 6/ de Bournazel, 7/ Roland then Pol Lapeyre, 8/ Surcouf, 9/ Saint Christophe then Général Janssen, 10/ Lyautey then Bonaparte, 11/ Colbert.
- Group #21 “Gallieni,” based in Renaison (Loire), then Les Noës (Loire) on 15 and in Roanne (Loire) in September–October. Dissolved on 30. Motto: “No matter what”. Publication: Pavillon haut or La Francisque. Teams: 1/ Aquitaine, 2/ Flandres, 3/ Lorraine, 4/ Languedoc, 5/ Béarn, 6/ Provence, 7/ Alsace, 8/ Bretagne, 9/ Ile-de-France, Poitou (training center), Berry (Direction Team).
- Group #22 “La-Tour-d’Auvergne” then “Joffre,” based in Messeix (Puy-de-Dôme). Created in August, dissolved on 30. Motto: “Through us, it will be reborn”. Publication: France-Montjoie. Teams: 1/ Mermoz, 2/ Unknown Soldier then Saumur, 3/ Guynemer, 4/ ?, 5/ D’Assas, 6/ Hoche, 7/ De Bournazel, 8/ Jeanne d’Arc, 9/ Verdun, 10/ Lyautey, 11/ De Lesseps (Direction Team).
- Group #32 “Jacques-Cœur,” based in Uzay-le-Venon (Cher), then in Bruère-Allichamps (Cher) on 5. Created on 5 or 6, dissolved in March. Motto: “To a valiant heart, nothing is impossible”. Publication: Cœur de France. Teams: 1/ Colbert, 2/ Dupleix, 3/ Surcouf then Mangin, 4/ Mermoz, 5/ Monjoie, 6/ Lyautey, 7/ Foch then Sully, 8/ Charcot, 9/ Péguy, 10/ Jean Bart, 11/ Vauban.
- Group #32. It appears that a Mermoz team, with the motto “always higher” (motto of Team 3, Group 32), was assigned to industrial production at the Foug foundry (part of the Pont-à-Mousson foundry) near Nancy. A pennant from that period seems to confirm this theory.
- Group #34 “Sully,” based in Mézières-en-Brenne (Indre), then in La Rochelle (Charente-Maritime). Created on 4 or 5, dissolved in June and transferred to the blue industrial production camps. Motto: “Hearts high”. Publication: La Brenne. Teams: 1/ Lyautey, 2/ Bayard, 3/ Charcot, 4/ de Foucault, 5/ de Bournazel, 6/ Mermoz, 7/ Weygand, 8/ Turenne, 9/ Vauban, 10/ La Flamme then Guynemer, 11/ Colbert.
- Group #39 “De Foucauld,” based in Montmarault (Allier), then in Boulouris (Var) in March. Created on 10, dissolved in March. Motto: “Never backward”. Publication: Le Passe-Partout, then La Bouble. Group leaders: Grange, Kunstler, Allard, then Coat for subgroup 204 in 1944. Teams: 1/ Bayard, 2/ De Bournazel, 3/ Davout, 4/ Dunkerque, 5/ D’Assas-Gironde, then D’Assas, 6/ Maréchal de Villars, 7/ Lyautey, 8/ Montjoie, then Bonaparte, 9/ Mermoz, 10/ Verdun, then Sidi Brahim, 11/ Guynemer.
- Group #40 “Les Arvernes” (disciplinary camp), based in Murat (Cantal), then in Hourtin (Gironde). Created by Article 4 of the law of 18, dissolved on 30. Motto: “Honor and discipline”. Publication: De là-haut. Teams: 1/ Sidi Bel Abbès, 2/ Verdun then Sidi Brahim, 3/ Lyautey then Dixmude, 4/ Le Téméraire, 5/ Bayard, 6/ Sully, 7/ Pasteur then Pol Lapeyre, Direction Team / Bournazel.
- Group #44 “Jeanne-d’Arc,” based in Courpière (Puy-de-Dôme), then Tarbes (Hautes-Pyrénées) in October–November. Dissolved on 30. Motto: “France, always”. Publication: L’étendard.

Regional Commissariat for the Languedoc Province

- Regional Commissariat, based in Montpellier (Hérault). Motto: “Take a bold stance”. Publication: Itinéraires
- Regional Leadership School (“L’Espelido”), based at the “Four Lords” camp near Montpellier (Hérault), opened on 1. Motto: “One leader, one faith”. Classes: “The Pioneers” class from 2 to June – “Our Flag” class from 1 to 30 – “Djibouti” class from November to 29 – “La Marseillaise” class from 26 to 15 – “Le Flambeau” class from 26 to 18.

The province included, at its creation, the following camps:

- Group #6 “De-Gévaudan” then “Calendal” on 1, based in Marvejols (Lozère), Laudun (Gard) from 1 to April, Marvejols (Lozère) from April to September, and Saint-Étienne (Puy-de-Dôme) until dissolution. Created on 26, dissolved on 30. Motto: “Mestie vau Baronie”. Publication: Gévaudan. Teams: 1/ Dunkerque, 2/ Albatros, 3/ Alsace-Lorraine, 4/ Lyautey, 5/ Du Guesclin, 6/ Saint-Louis, 7/ Le Coq, 8/ Etchenou, 9/ De Foucault, 10/ Verdun, 11/ Guynemer.
- Group #18 “Chevalier-d’Assas,” based in Le Vigan (Gard), then Maurs (Cantal) from April. Created in winter 1940, dissolved on 1. Motto: “Second to none”. Publication: L’Aigoual. Teams: ?/ Charcot, 3/ de Foucauld, 10/ L’Aiglon.
- Group #19 “Dixmude,” based in Meyrueis (Lozère), then in Aguessac (Aveyron) from 15. Dissolved in May–June in Meyrueis. Motto: “It follows”. Publication: Ça suit.
- Group #23 “Malgré,” based in Saint-Pons (Hérault) until 24, then in Lodève (Hérault), Aguessac (Aveyron) on 3, and Toulouse (Haute-Garonne) in September–October. Dissolved on 1 in Toulouse and assigned to industrial production. Motto: “Despite obstacles”. Publication: Malgré. Teams or camps: ?/ Charcot Camp (Les Verreries), 2/ Weygand (Foncontal), 9/ Lyautey, 11/ Saint Pons.
- Group #24 “Le Pourquoi pas ?,” based in Lodève (Hérault), Saint-Pons-de-Thomières (Hérault), Saint-Affrique (Aveyron) from 20 to 1, and Tulle (Corrèze) in September–October. Created on 28, dissolved on 30. Motto: “Straight to the goal”. Publication: Le coup de hache or Pourquoi pas ?. Teams: 1/ Duguay-Trouin, 2/ Surcouf, 3/ Jean Bart, 4/ Lyautey, 5/ Jeanne d’Arc, 6/ Saint Georges, 7/ Roland, 8/ De Bournazel, 9/ Vercingétorix, 10/ Bayard, 11/ Charcot, 12/ De Foucault.
- Group #25 “Roland,” based in Le Bousquet-d’Orb (Hérault), in Lunas (Hérault) in August 1941, then in Mauriac (Cantal) in March–July. Created on 20, dissolved on 30. Motto: “Camaraderie, discipline”. Publication: L’Élan and L’écho de Roland. Teams: 1/ Commandant Cébrié, 2/ Maginot then Weygand, 3/ Guynemer, 4/ Durandal, 5/ Jean Bart, 6/ Verdun, 7/ De Foucault, 8/ Lyautey, 9/ Du Guesclin, 10/ Mermoz, 11/ Alsace-Lorraine, 12/ De Foucault.
- Group #35 “De la Montagne Noire,” based in Labruguière (Tarn). Created in 1940?, dissolved in May and assigned to the blue industrial production camps in Perpignan and Montlouis. Motto: “Straight ahead”. Publication: La montagne noire.
- Group #45 “Saumur,” based in Saint-Hippolyte-du-Fort–Anduze (Gard), then in Brioude (Haute-Loire). Created on 1, dissolved on 1. Motto: “Straight on”. Publication: Saumur. Teams: 1/?, 2/?, 3/?, 4/ Caravelle (sailboat), 5/?, 6/?, 7/?, 8/?, 9/?, 10/?, 11/?.

Regional Commissariat for the Pyrénées-Gascogne Province

- Regional Commissariat, based in Toulouse (Haute-Garonne). Motto: “Serve and hope”. Publication: Espoir.
- Regional Leadership School (Saint-Louis), based at the Château de l’Espinet, Montaudran (Haute-Garonne), opened in April. Motto: “Leader and apostles”. Classes: “France” class ending on 19 – “Alsace-Lorraine” class – “Lyautey” class from 8 to June – “Verdun” class – “Chef Boullet” class from November to 1; Tribute to Commissioner Boullet, who died in service on 12. – Class composed of “Cyrards” from the “Charles de Foucauld” class, graduated late 1943.

The province included, at its creation, the following camps:

- Group #26 “Le Camp-des-Maréchaux” and “Les Loups,” based in Saint-Gaudens (Haute-Garonne), then in Sauveterre-de-Comminges (Haute-Garonne), Felletin (Creuse), Le Tuzan (Gironde). Created in August, assigned to industrial production on 1. Motto: “Fervor”. Publication: Les loups de Comminges. Teams: 1/ Lannes, 2/ Galliéni, 3/ Franchet d’Esperey, 4/ Kellermann, 5/ Augereau, 6/ Mac Mahon, 7/ Bugeaud, 8/ Ney, 9/ Turenne, 10/ Murat, 11/ Camps des Maréchaux.
- Group #27 “Mangin,” based in Brassac and Bénac (Ariège), then in Aigueperse (Puy-de-Dôme). Created at the end of August, relocated in 1943 to Aigueperse, where, in 1944, subgroup 202 also existed. Motto: “Always ready,” then “Serve”. Publication: Hardi. Teams: 1/ d’Assas, 2/ Gouraud, 3/ de Bournazel, 4/ Charcot, 5/ Bayard then Bugeaud, 6/ Mermoz, 7/ Lyautey, 8/ de Foucauld, 9/ Dupleix, 10/ Guynemer, 11/ Direction Team, Jean Bart.
- Group #28 “Péguy,” based in Castillon-en-Couserans (Ariège), then Saint-Germain-des-Prés and Bergerac (Dordogne). Created in August, moved to Dordogne in March, then assigned to the Bergerac powder magazine service at the end of August. Motto: “Work, our fortune”. Publication: L’écho de Castillon. Teams: 1/ Nancy, 2/ Metz, 3/ Strasbourg, 4/ Domremy, 5/ Bouvines/Valmy, 6/ Sarreguemines, 7/ Calais, 8/ Lunéville, 9/ Dunkerque, 10/ J.E.S.
- Group #29 “Bugeaud,” based in Formiguères (Pyrénées-Orientales), then in Saint-Amans-Valtoret (Tarn) on 15, Argelès (Pyrénées-Orientales) on 1, and Pissos (Landes) in October–November. Created in August, assigned to industrial production on 1. Motto: “For France alone, always”. Publication: L’élan.
- Group #30 “Foch,” based in Saint-Pé-de-Bigorre (Hautes-Pyrénées), then Argentat (Corrèze) and Toulouse (Haute-Garonne). Created in September?, assigned to industrial production on 1. Motto: “Work is to serve”. Publication: Le Gave. Commanded by Jean Morin and François Missoffe, future minister under General de Gaulle. Teams: 1/ Dunkerque, 2/ Flandres, 3/ Alsace, 4/ Dixmude, 5/ Argonne, 6/ Vercors, 7/ Yser, 8/ Marne, 9/ Douaumont, 10/ Somme, 11/ Direction Team, Verdun.
- Group #31 “Guynemer,” based in Arudy (Pyrénées-Atlantiques), then in Barbaste (Lot-et-Garonne). Assigned to industrial production on 1. Motto: “Face forward”. Publication: La Cigogne. Teams: 1/ Picardie, 2/ Bretagne, 3/ Béarn, 4/ Savoie, 5/ Gascogne, 6/ Auvergne, 7/ Vendée, 8/ Normandie, 9/ Flandres, 10/ Ile-de-France, 11/ Provence.
- Group #36 “Montcalm,” based in Casteljaloux (Lot-et-Garonne), then in Sainte-Livrade (Lot-et-Garonne). Dissolved on 15. Motto: “Manibus nostris patria vivet” (“By our hands, our country will live”). Publication: Renaissance.
- Group #38 “Jean-Mermoz,” based in Argelès-Gazost (Hautes-Pyrénées), then in Nontron (Dordogne) and Belin (Gironde). Assigned to industrial production on 1. Motto: “Impossible, never”. Publication: L’arc en ciel. Teams: 1/ Verdun, 2/ Marne, 3/ Champagne, 4/ Grand Couronné, 5/ Flandres, 6/ Yser, 7/ Dunkerque, 8/ Artois, 9/ Vosges, 10/ Argonne, 11/ Direction Team, France.
- Group #47 “Pol-Lapeyre,” based in Gabarret (Landes), then in Casteljaloux (Lot-et-Garonne). Assigned to industrial production on 1. Motto: “Hold fast”. Publication: Renaissance.

Regional Commissariat for the Provence Province

- Regional Commissariat, based in Marseille (Bouches-du-Rhône). Motto: “Step by step”. Publication: Jeunes de Provence.
- Regional Leadership School, based in Le Lavandou (Var). Created on 1. Motto: “You will serve”. Classes: “Ardent Relay” class from 15 to 19 – “Pioneers of the Marshal” class from August to November – Unknown class from 15 to September – “Wounded Provence” class.
- Nutrition School, based in Hyères (Var).

The province included, at its creation, the following camps:

- Group #13 “Bonaparte,” based in Cavaillon (Vaucluse). Dissolved on 1. Motto: “Order and grandeur”. Publication: Lubéron-Durance.
- Group #14 “Du Guesclin,” based in Die (Drôme). Created at the end of August, dissolved on 30. Motto: “I will maintain”. Publication: Je maintiendrai. Teams: 1/ Charcot, 2/ Guynemer, 3/ Lyautey, 4/ Bournazel, 5/ De Foucault, 6/ Bayard, 7/ Jacques Cartier, 8/ De Brazza, 9/ Roland, 10/ Laperrine.
- Group #15 “Esterel,” based in Agay (Var), then in Saint-Jean-en-Royans (Drôme) on 15 and in Valence (Drôme) in June. Dissolved in 1944. Motto: “Noblesse obliges, Esterel as much”. Publication: L’Esterel. Teams: 1/ Dramont Marine, 5/ Esterel Pioneers, 7/ Michel Detroyat, 8/ Saint Louis, 9/ Jacques Cartier, 10/ Renaissance.
- Group #16 “Forêt-du-Rouet,” based in Le Muy (Var), then in Manosque (Alpes-de-Haute-Provence). Dissolved on 9. Motto: “He who rises singing”. Publication: L’Alouette. Teams: 1/ Jeanne d’Arc, 2/ Joffre then Foch, 3/ De Bournazel, 4/ Foucauld, 5/ Guynemer, 6/ Lyautey, 7/ Saint Louis, 8/ Bayard, 9/ Verdun, 10/ Roland, 11/ Finlande (Direction Group).
- Group #17 “Mistral,” based in Hyères Beach (Var). Dissolved on 30. Motto: “Serve, then finish”. Publication: Le Mistral.
- Group #33 “Le-Ventoux,” based in Nyons (Drôme), then in Lussolle (Landes) in September–October. Created in March, dissolved on 1. Motto: “To a valiant heart, nothing is impossible”. Publication: L’aurore or Le Ventoux.
- Group #37 “Bayard,” based in Gap-Charance (Hautes-Alpes). Dissolved on 15. Motto: “Without fear or reproach”. Publication: Remountaren.
- Group #46 “Suffren,” based in Le Cannet-des-Maures (Var), Group 7, Lafayette Company. Dissolved on 1. Motto: “Ardi Jouinesso” (in Provençal: “Bold youth”). Publication: Ardi Jouinesso (in Provençal: “Bold youth”). Teams: 1/?, 2/?, 3/?, 4/?, 5/?, 6/?, 7/?, 8/ Face Forward, 9/?, 10/ Brazza, 11/ Agnely.

Regional Commissariat for the North Africa Province

- Regional Commissariat, based in Alger (Algeria), dissolved on 7. Motto: “Through us, France will revive”. Publication: Rebâtir.
- Regional Leadership School, based in Fort-de-l’Eau (Algeria), created on 1. Motto: “Learn to better serve”. Classes: “?” class from 30 to 30 – “?” class from 11 to 20.

The province included, at its creation, the following camps:

- Group #101 “Weygand,” based in Camp Boulhaut (Morocco). Dissolved on 14. Motto: “Virtute et viribus” (“By virtue and strength”). Publication: Renouveau.
- Group #102 “Dunkerque,” based in Tlemcen (Algeria). Dissolved on 14. Motto: “I will maintain”. Publication: Plein vent.
- Group #103 “Isly,” based in Cherchell (Algeria). Dissolved on 14. Motto: “No matter what”. Publication: Quand même. Teams: 1/ Bayard, 2/, 3/ Joffre, 4/, 5/ Pétain, 6/ Weygand, 7/ Ney, 8/ ?, 9/ ?, 10/ Guynemer, 11/ Murat, Direction Team / Jeanne d’Arc.
- Group #104 “Lamoricière,” based in Djidjelli (Algeria). Dissolved on 14. Motto: “Joy in effort”. Publication: Jeunes.
- Group #105 “Saint-Louis,” based in Tabarka (Tunisia). Created on 15, dissolved on 28. Motto: “One for all, all for one”. Publication: Résurrection.
- Group #106 “Franchet d’Esperey,” created in Bizerte, then based in Sbeïtla (Tunisia). Created on 1, dissolved on 1, became the 106th Tunisian Workers’ Battalion (BTT), tasked with guarding Axis prisoners of war. On 1, it was transformed into the 106th Tunisian March Battalion (BTT), then into the 4th Zouave Regiment (4th RZ) on 16. Motto: “El Aina, Truckel, Saic” (in Arabic: “This path is the source of happiness”). Then ephemeral: ? ? ?.
- Group #107 “Laperrine,” based in the Ouarsenis (Algeria). Created in May, dissolved on 14. Motto: “The lion fights and does not betray”.
- Group #108 “?,” based in Bir-el-Bey (Tunisia). Created on 8, dissolved in April.

=== End of the Chantiers ===
- From 20 to 1: relocation of 16 border groups.
- From June–July to September: creation of 8 subgroups, disbanded in August–September: #150 in Saint-Rémy-de-Provence (Bouches-du-Rhône) – #151 in Paray-le-Monial (Saône-et-Loire) – #152 in Bergerac, Dordogne – #153 in Orange, Vaucluse – #154 in Sorgues – #155 in Lescar (Pyrénées-Atlantiques) – #156 in Saint-Martin-du-Touch (Haute-Garonne) – #157 in Carcassonne (Aude).
- Then 3 groups: #150 in Cavaillon, created on 1 with elements from dissolved Group 16 and former subgroup 150 – #153 in Orange, created on 1 by merging subgroups 153 and 154 and elements from dissolved groups 16 and 17 – #158 in Toulouse, created on 1 with elements from Group 30 and subgroups #155, #156, and #157.
- And finally 11 subgroups: – #201 in Tronçais Forest (Allier, Montluçon arrondissement and Cérilly canton for the largest area), created on 1, dissolved on 1 – #202 in Aigueperse (Puy-de-Dôme), created on 1 – #203 in Bruère-Allichamps (Cher), created on 1 – #204 in Montmarault (Allier), created on 1 – #205 in Bourg (Ain), created on 1 – #206 in Poligny (Jura), created on 1 – #207 in Sathonay (Ain), created on 1 – #208 in Les Noes (Loire), created on 1 – #209 in Robion (Vaucluse), created on 1 – #210 in Aguessac (Aveyron), created on 1 – #211 in Labruguière (Tarn), created on 1.

=== Other organizations ===
Two similar organizations also existed:

- Jeunesse et Montagne, led by air force officers, dissolved on 1.
- Chantiers de jeunesse de la marine, led by navy officers, dissolved in 1943.

It is estimated that between 300,000 and 500,000 people passed through the camps. At the beginning of 1943, the permanent workforce was around 60,000 youths. It is estimated that about 16,000 youths from the camps were directly sent to the STO in Germany from their groups.

== Insignia ==
General Insignia

At the end of October, General Joseph de La Porte du Theil asked the heads of “works” at the General Commissariat in Châtel-Guyon (Puy-de-Dôme) to propose an insignia design. Colonel Créange, a veteran of 1914–1918, suggested a quick sketch with the triptych ultimately adopted: wheat ears, the tricolor flag, and the rising sun over a green horizon.

- The wheat ears symbolized France’s regeneration through the education or training of its youth, with the idea of reaping the benefits later.
- The “drooping” French flag symbolized France: it did not deserve to be fully unfurled due to the defeat, but the wheat ears offered hope that it would one day be raised again.
- The sun symbolized hope. It rises above the greenery, the environment of the youth camps. In the metal version of the insignia, tents were added on the green background. They represented the only shelter for the camps’ pioneers, who, in August and September, had only individual tents for protection in the best cases.

This design was refined by Gabriel Séjourné, a student at the Beaux-Arts. The first examples seem to have been delivered at the end of 1940.

From this general insignia, several variants were made, in fabric and metal, across reissues. Large fabric insignia were worn on the chest, on the right side. They were also sewn onto the beret, but in smaller sizes, sometimes featuring the group’s number. The chest fabric model was the only one regulated and was subject to a publication in the Journal officiel in 1941.

Regarding the variations of embroidered chest fabric insignia, it is difficult today to place them chronologically. Differences relate to the background color (blue, black, green), larger or smaller sizes, and the presence or absence of the “CJF” (“Chantiers de la jeunesse française”) inscription, which was omitted in the final print.

A significant design change occurred starting at the end of 1943. A very sober model on a black background, without the “CJF” inscription, sun, or greenery, was made available to armaments factories under the supervision of “Industrial Production” (working for the occupier) from September. This insignia seems to have been worn only by cadres.

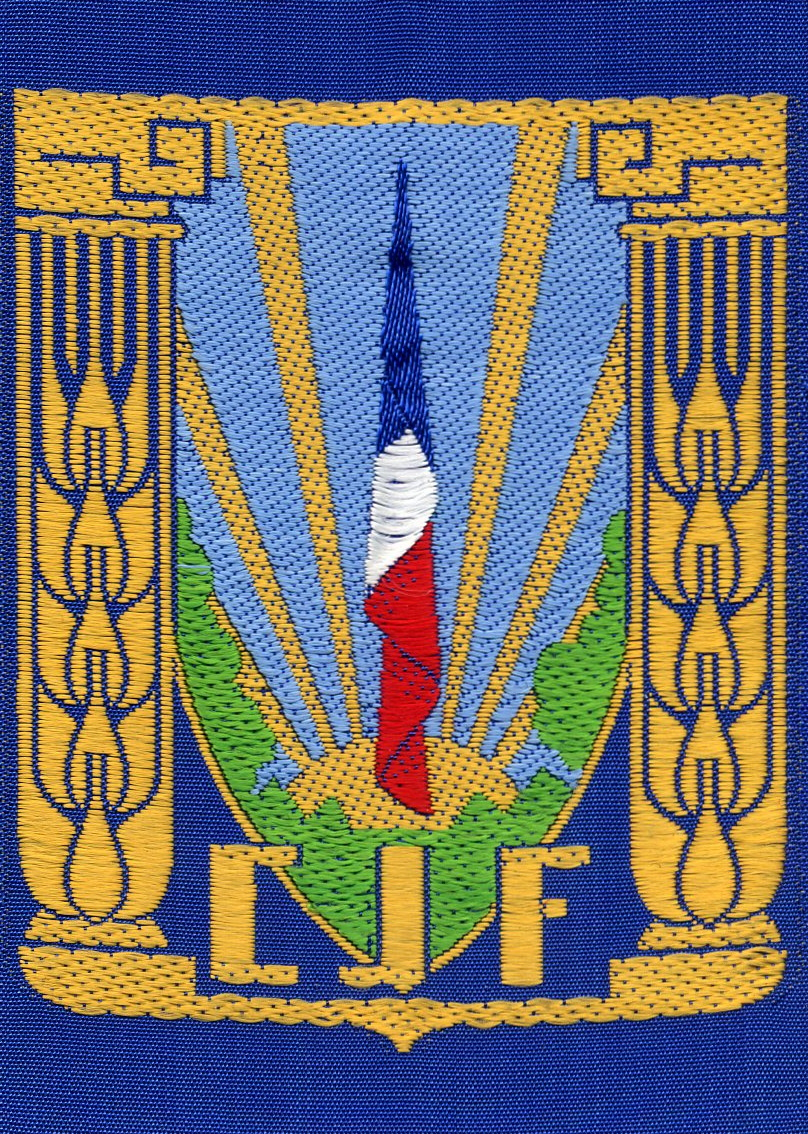
CJF insignia (first model) blue.

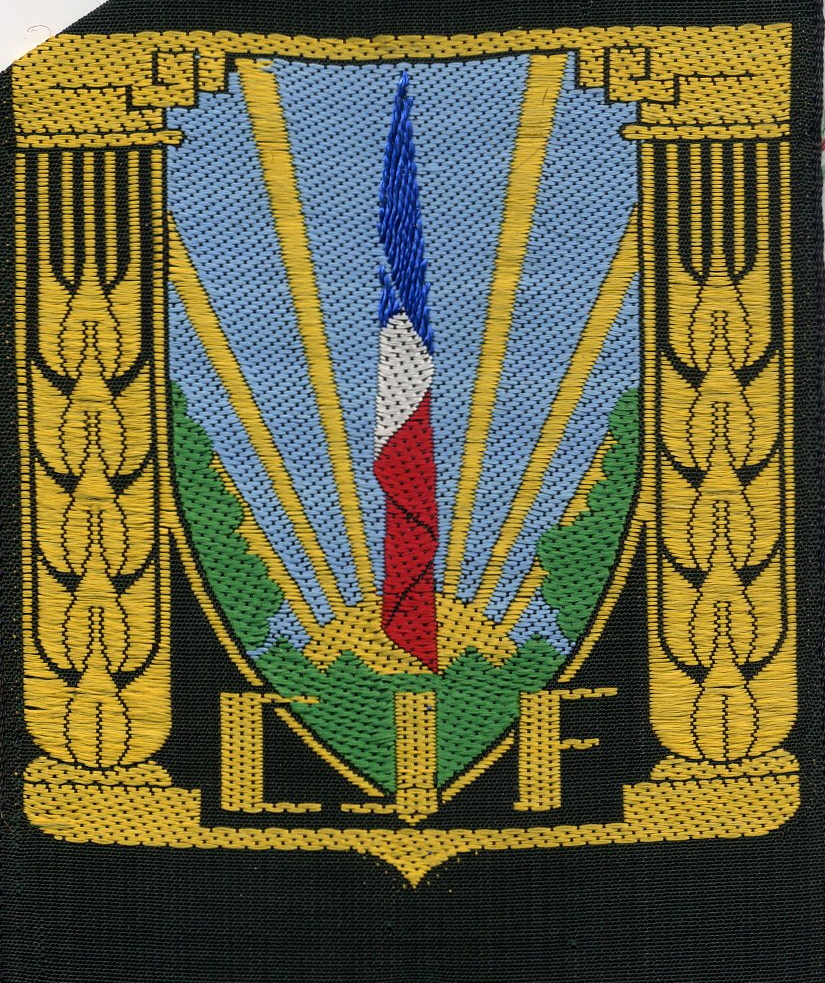
CJF insignia (first model) black.

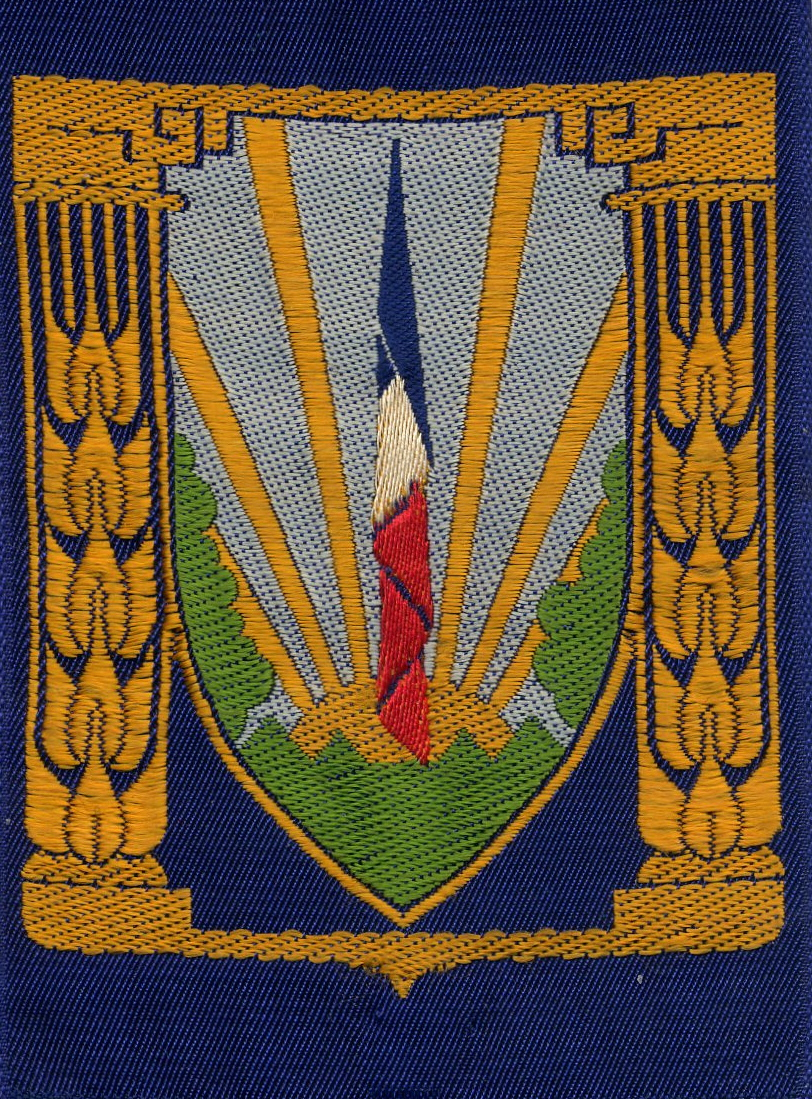
CJF insignia (second model).

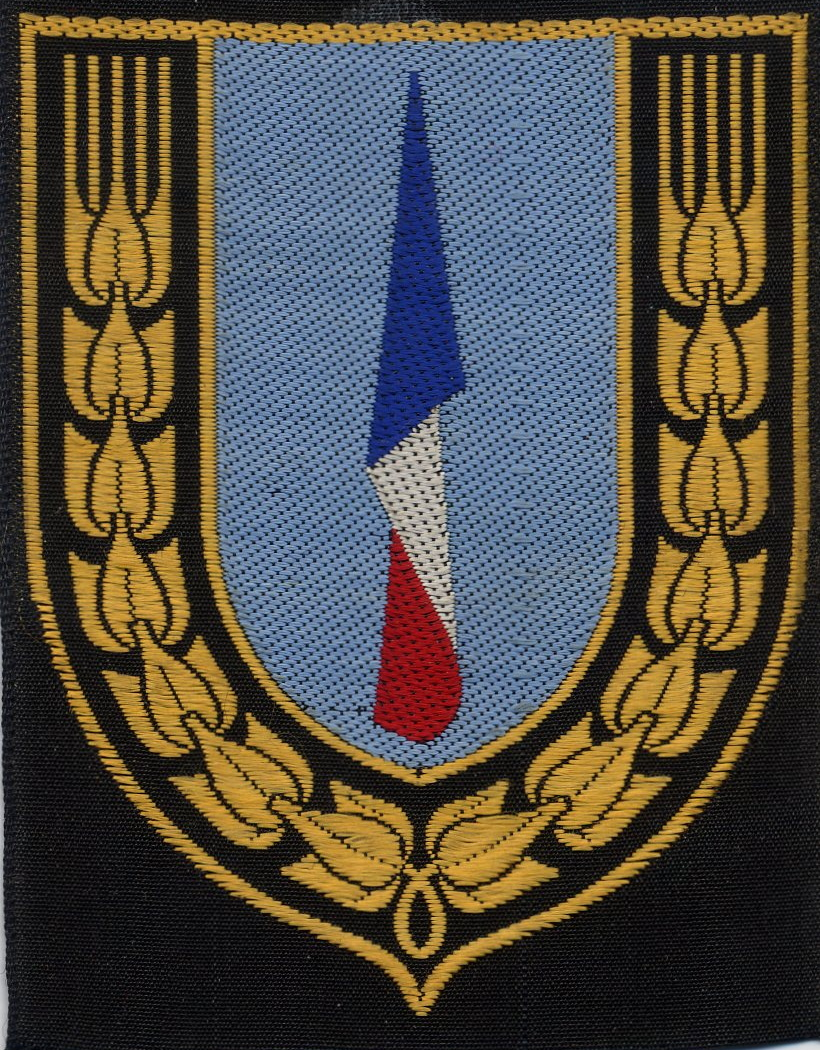
Industrial Production insignia.

Insignia of the Administrative Leadership School

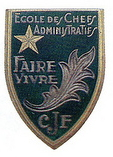
Metal insignia of the Administrative Leadership School.

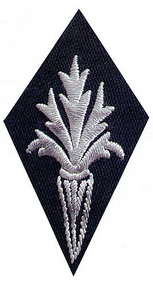
Fabric insignia of the Administrative Leadership School.

Insignia of Regional Commissariats and Regional Leadership Schools

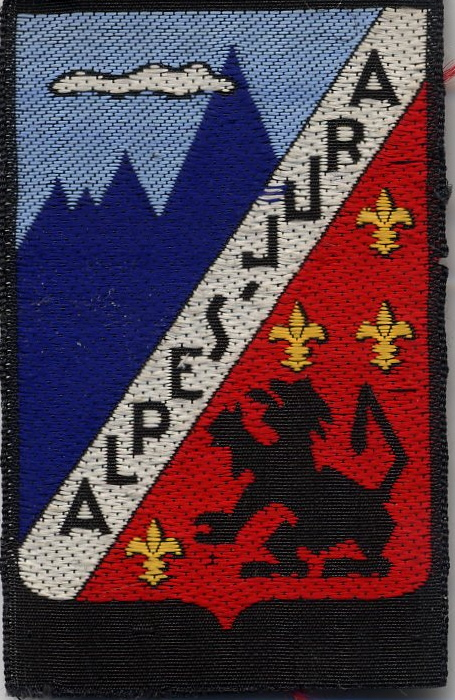
Insignia of the Regional Commissariat for Alpes-Jura.

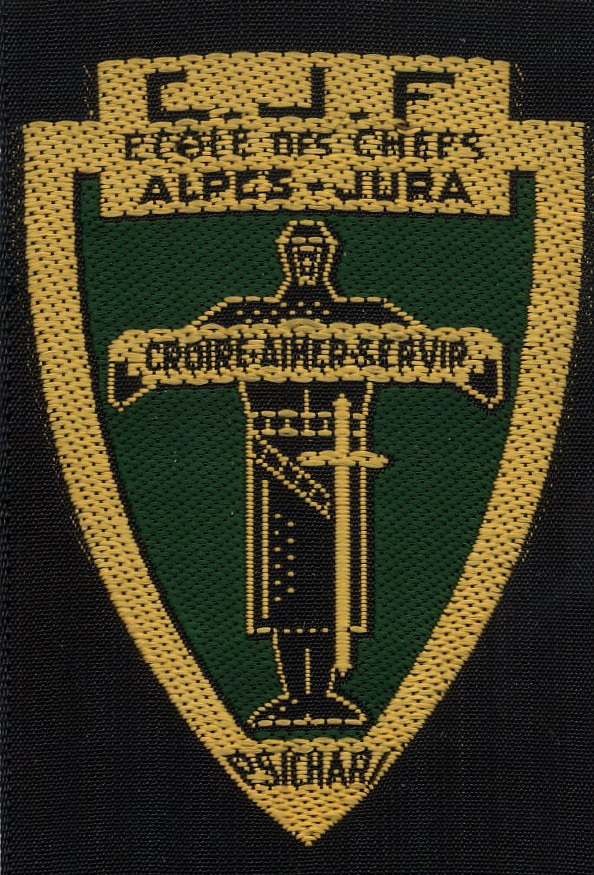
Insignia of the Leadership School for Alpes-Jura.
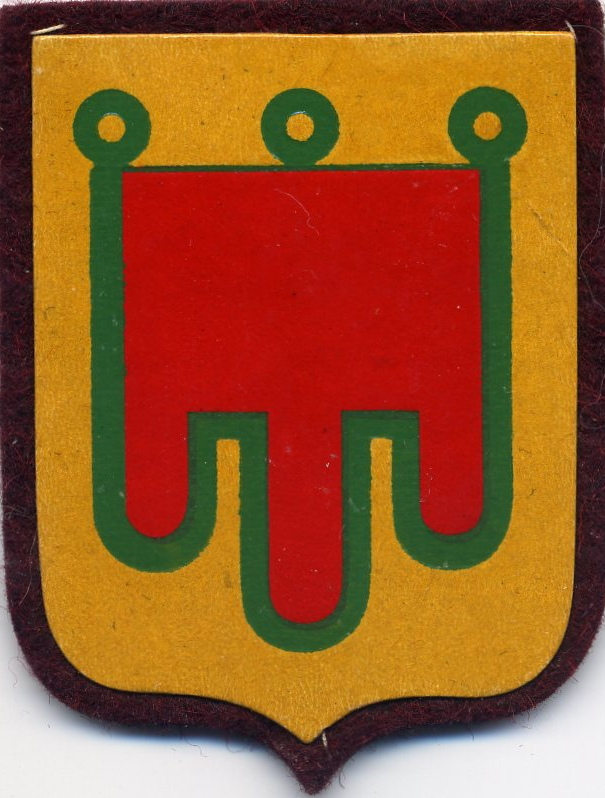
Insignia of the Regional Commissariat AUVERGNE (first model).

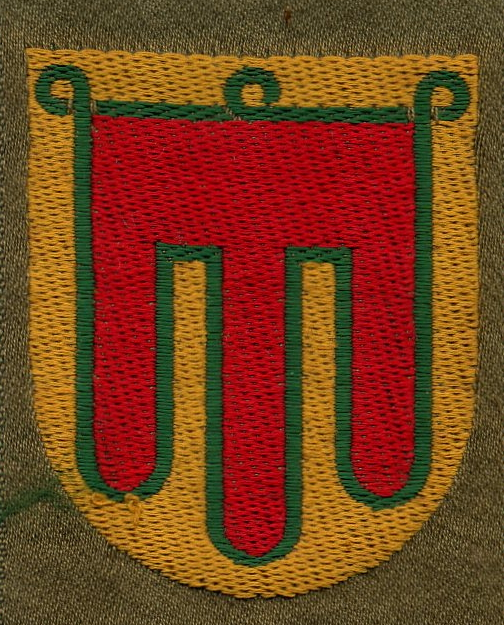
Insignia of the Regional Commissariat AUVERGNE (second model).

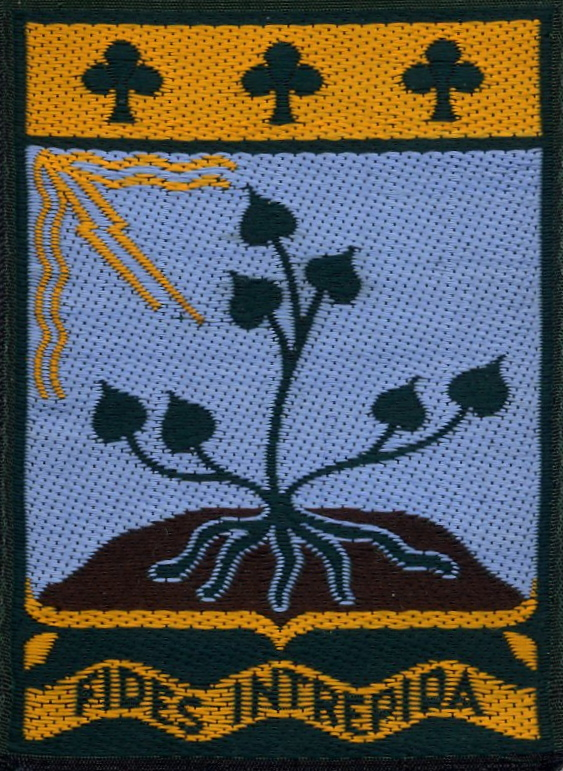
Insignia of the Leadership School AUVERGNE.

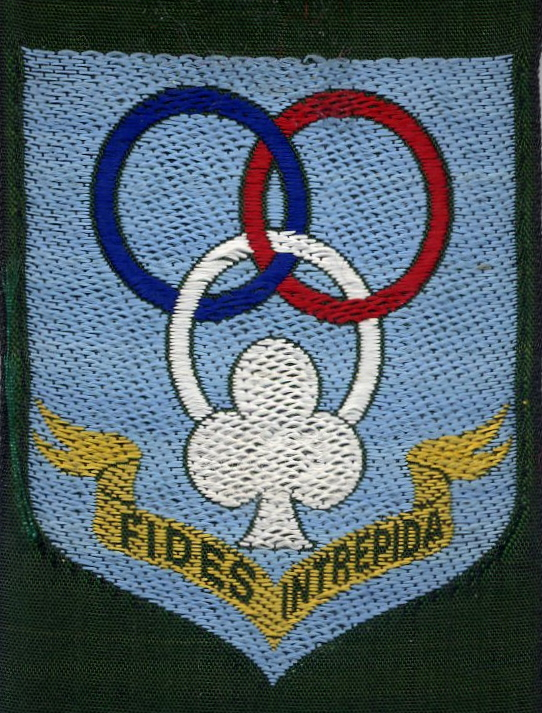
Insignia of the Sports School AUVERGNE.

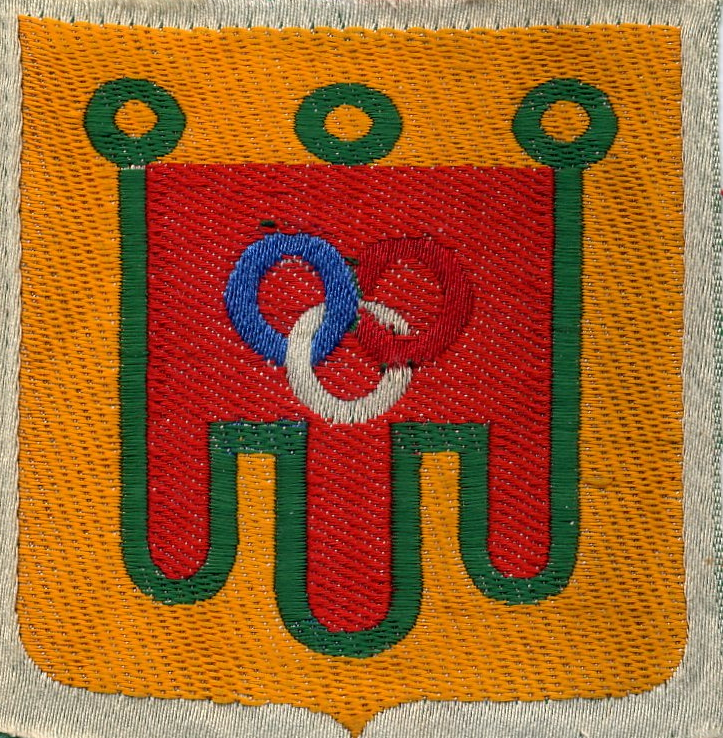
Insignia of the Sports School AUVERGNE (project).
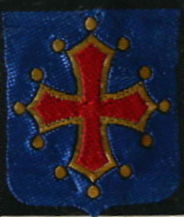
Insignia of the Regional Commissariat LANGUEDOC.
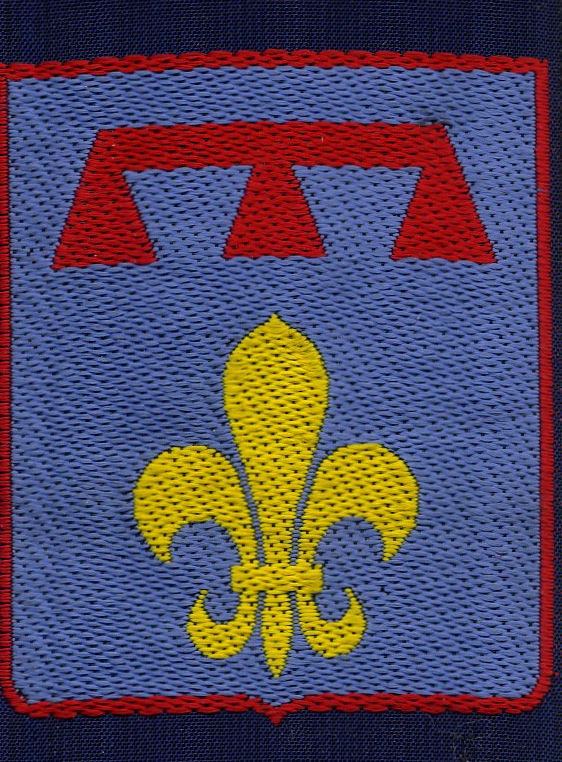
Insignia of the Regional Commissariat PROVENCE.

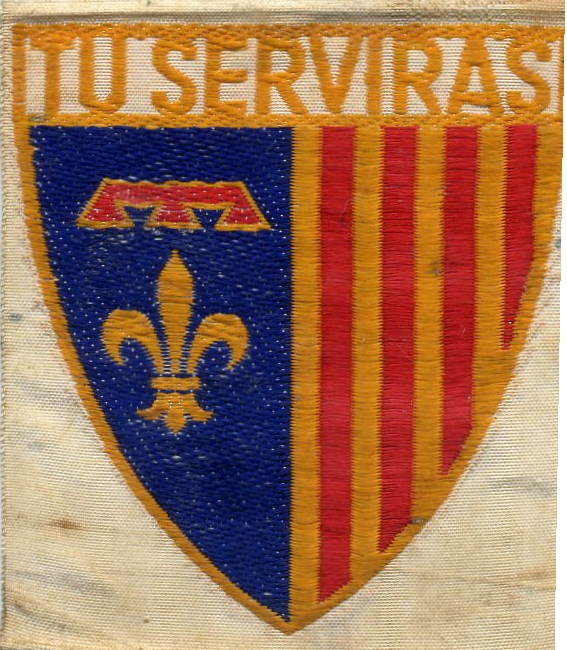
Insignia of the Leadership School PROVENCE.
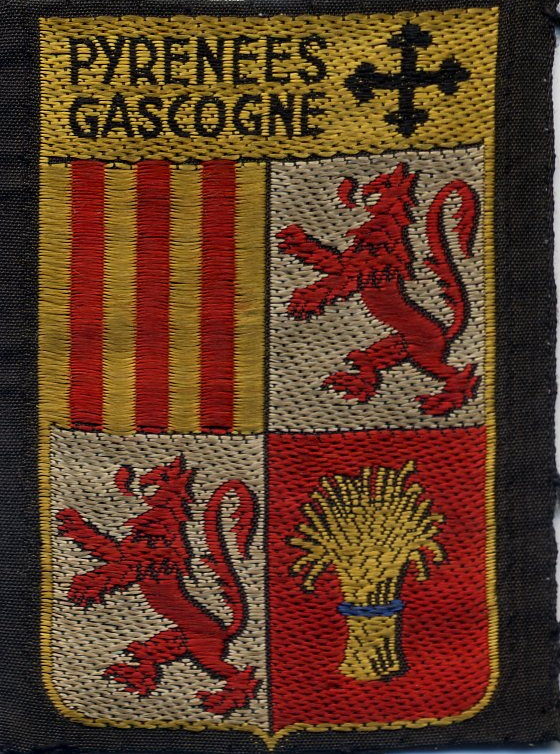
Insignia of the Regional Commissariat PYRÉNÉES-GASCOGNE.

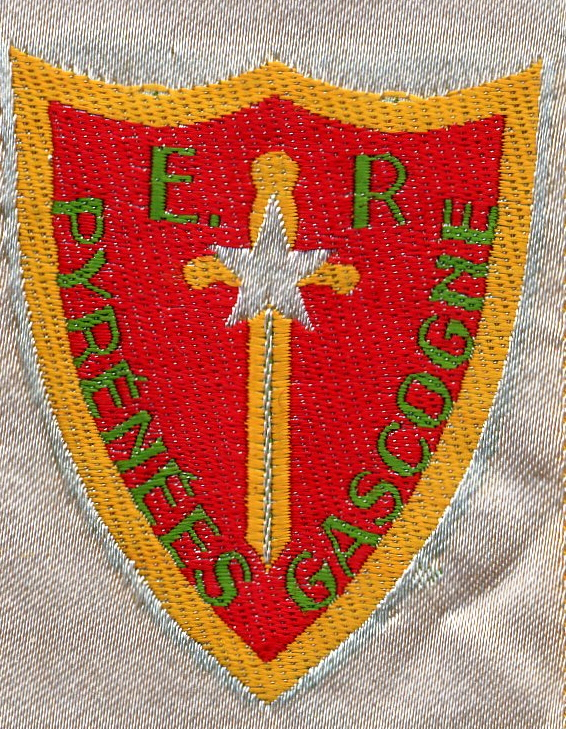
Insignia of the Leadership School PYRÉNÉES-GASCOGNE (first model).

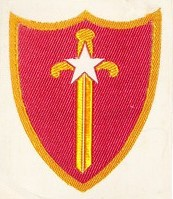
Insignia of the Leadership School PYRÉNÉES-GASCOGNE (second model).
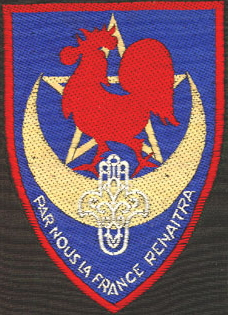
Insignia of the Regional Commissariat NORTH AFRICA.

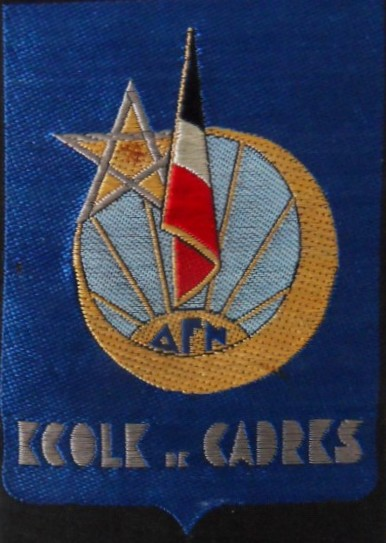
Insignia of the Leadership School NORTH AFRICA.

Insignia of Specialist Schools

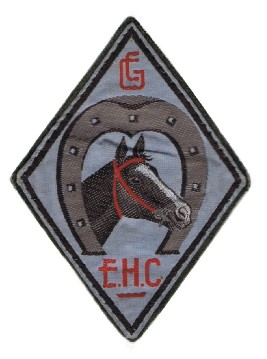
Insignia of the Equestrian Establishment of the Work Camps.

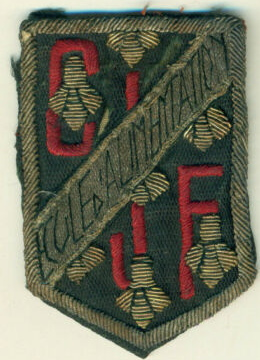
Insignia of the Nutrition School of the Work Camps.

Fabric Insignia of Groups

The insignia is worn on the left arm, with the upper end 8 cm below the shoulder.

The first model of Groups 3, 15, 23, 30, and 38 was made in moleskin with the design applied. Generally, this moleskin was placed on a felt backing in the group’s color. Group 41 never existed. Group 107 in North Africa had no insignia due to its short existence. Group 108, created by Commissioner Tartarin after the Allied landing in November and loyal to Vichy, adopted the insignia of the Zouave regiments of the armistice army, with the only difference being the crescent moon now in gold cannetille.

The creation of the Compulsory Labor Service led to the formation of subgroups assigned to the occupier (work on airfields, etc.), which became full groups by the end of 1943. They were numbered 150 to 158; only Groups 151 and 153 seem to have had insignia.

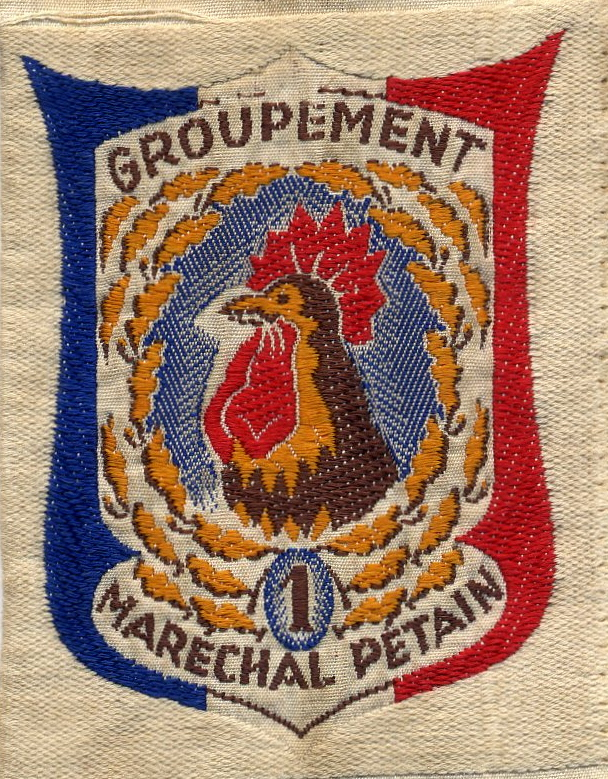
Insignia of CJF 1.

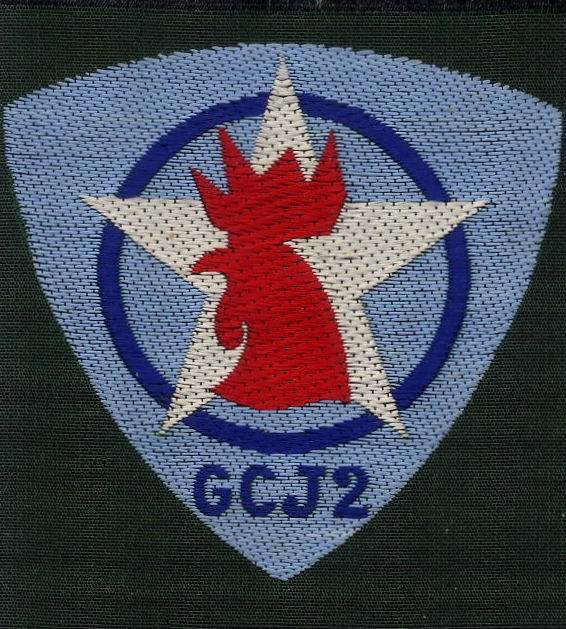
Insignia of CJF 2.

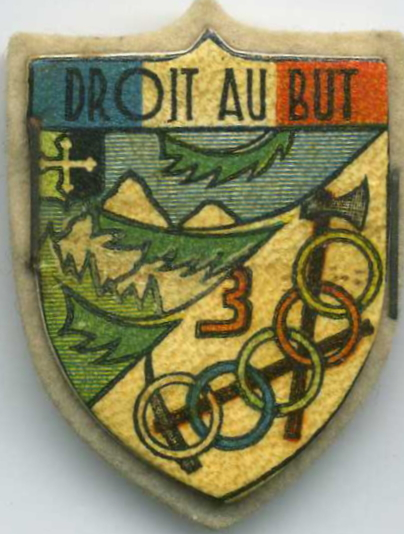
Insignia of CJF 3 (first model) - h = 4.5 cm.

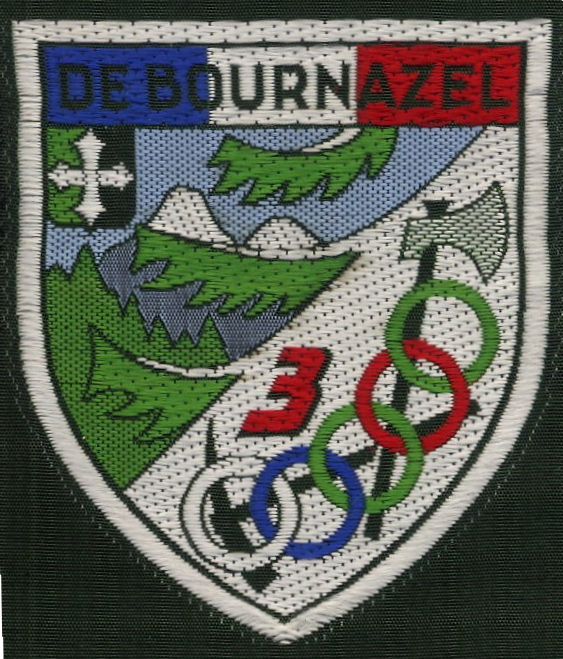
Insignia of CJF 3 (second model).

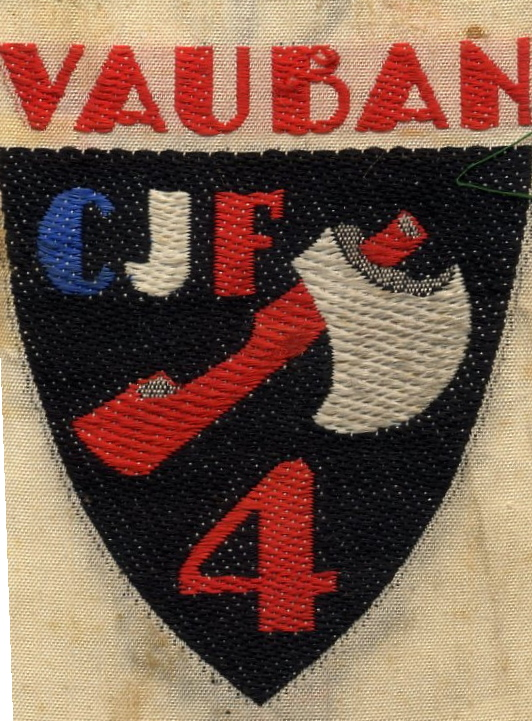
Insignia of CJF 4 (orange).

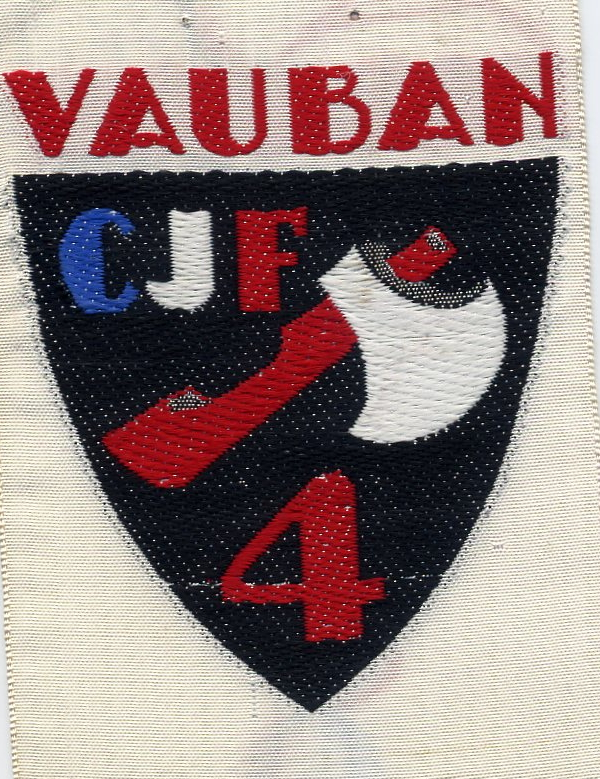
Insignia of CJF 4 (red).

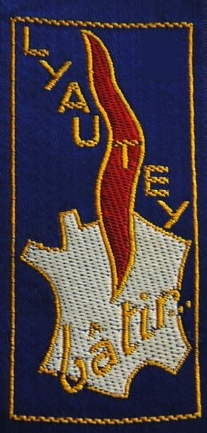
Insignia of CJF 5 (first model).

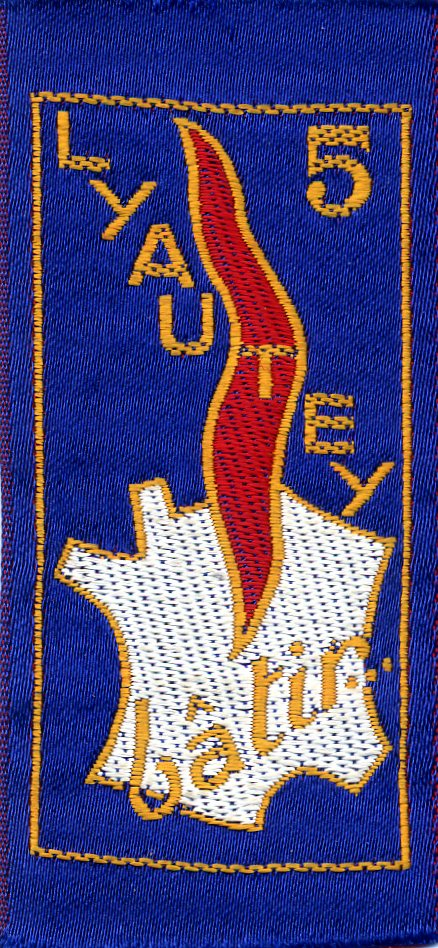
Insignia of CJF 5 (second model).

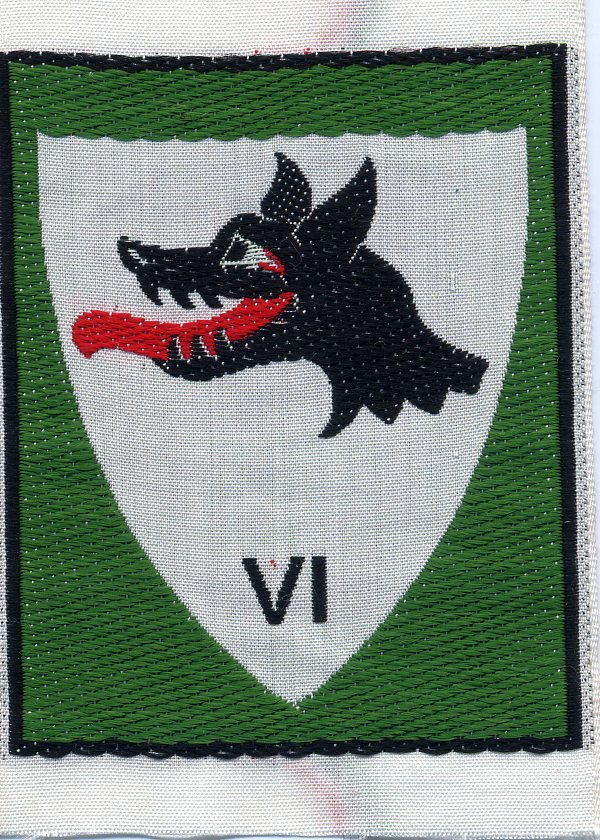
Insignia of CJF 6.

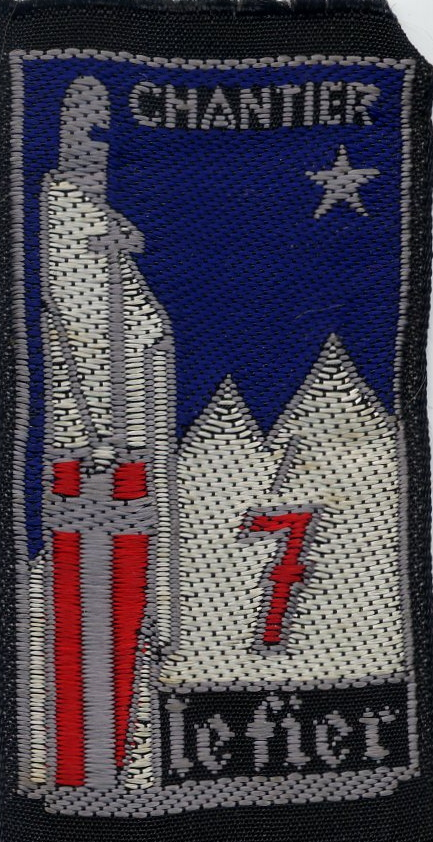
Insignia of CJF 7.

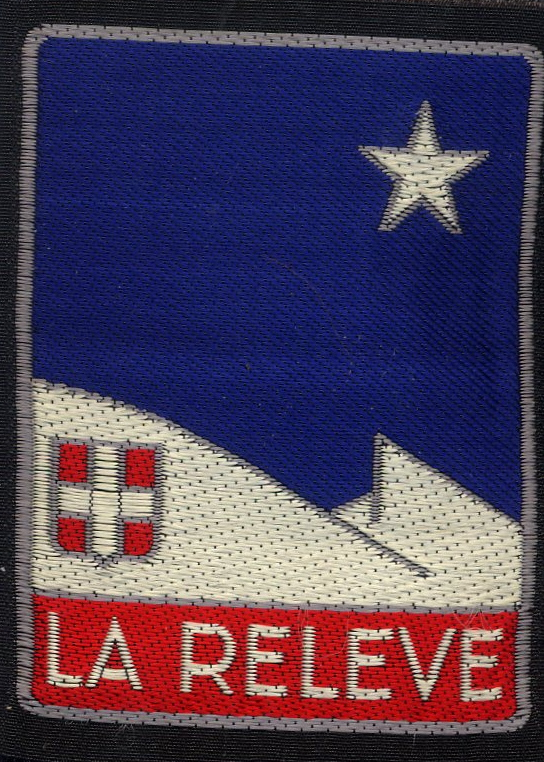
Insignia of CJF 8 (first model).

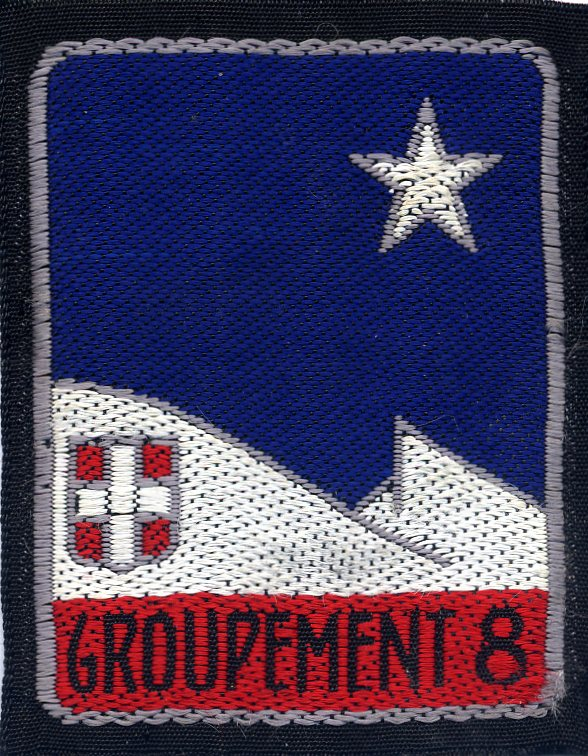
Insignia of CJF 8 (second model).

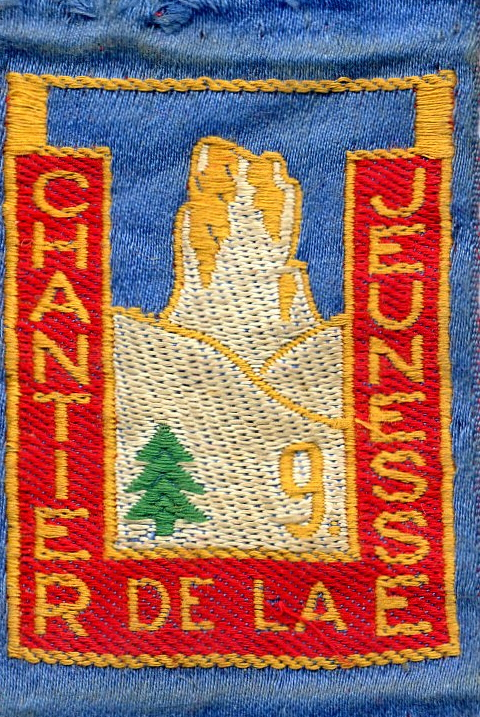
Insignia of CJF 9 (first model).

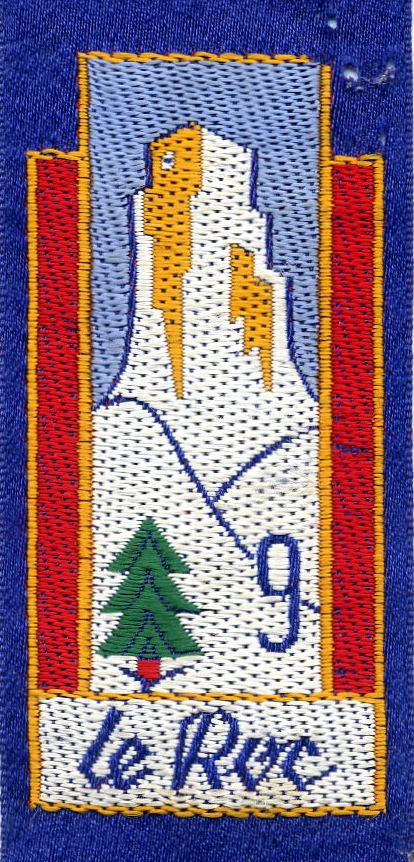
Insignia of CJF 9 (second model).

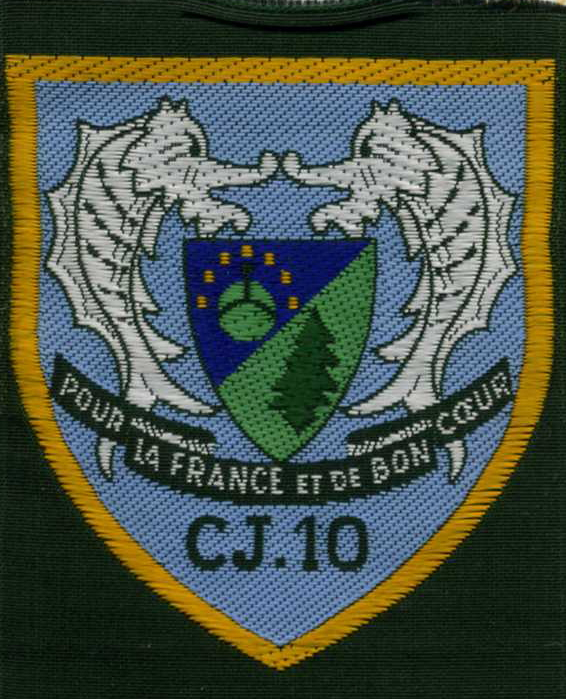
Insignia of CJF 10 (first model).

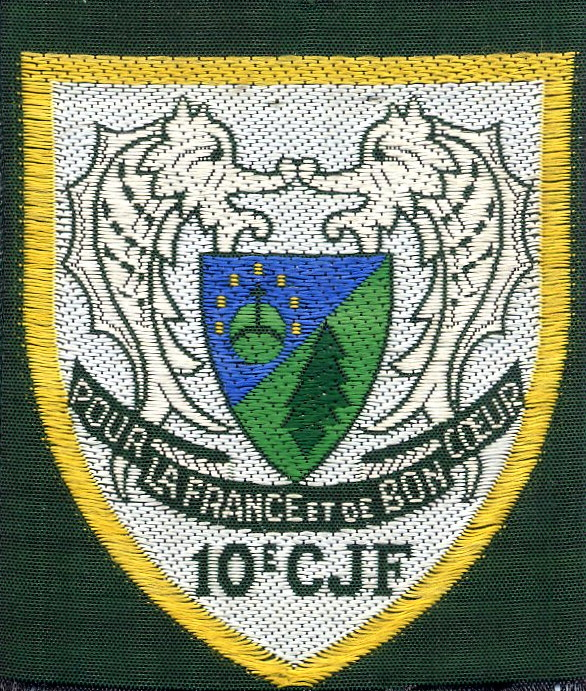
Insignia of CJF 10 (second model).

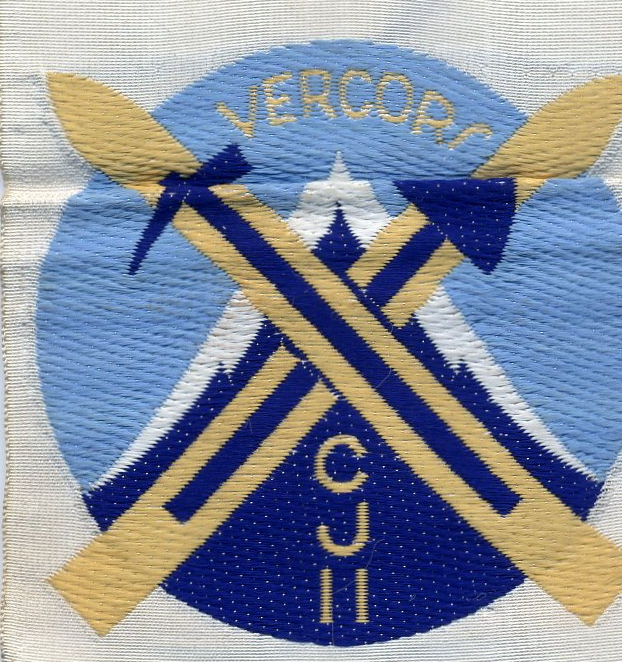
Insignia of CJF 11 (second model).

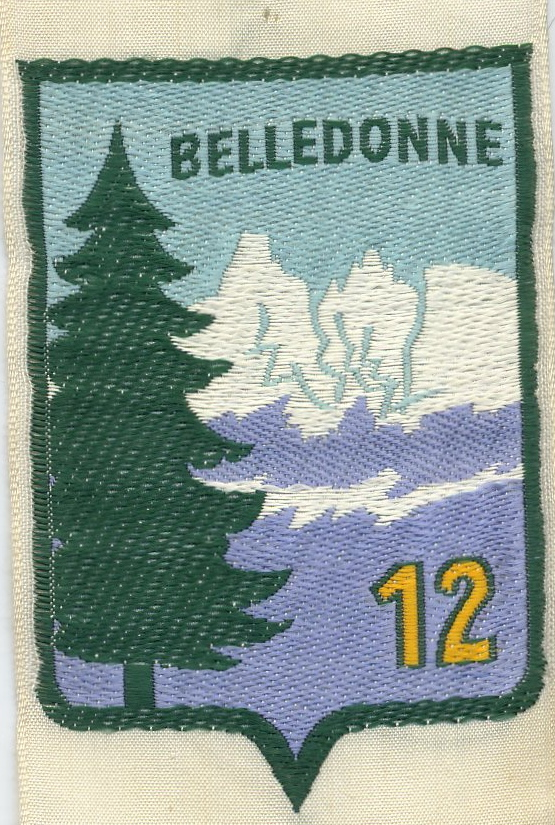
Insignia of CJF 12.

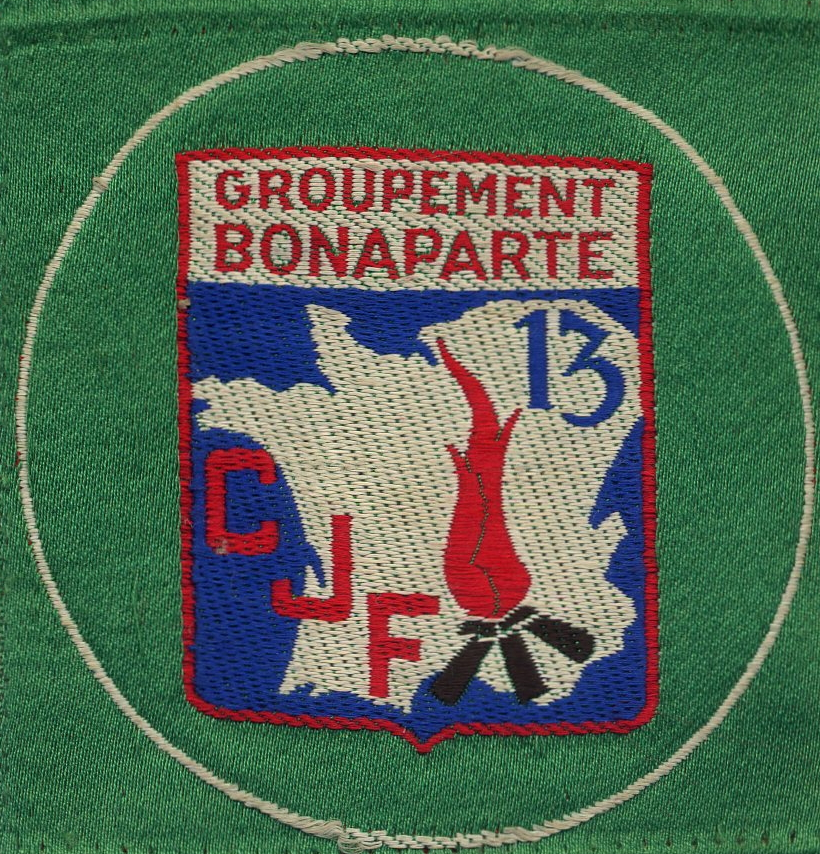
Insignia of CJF 13 (first model).

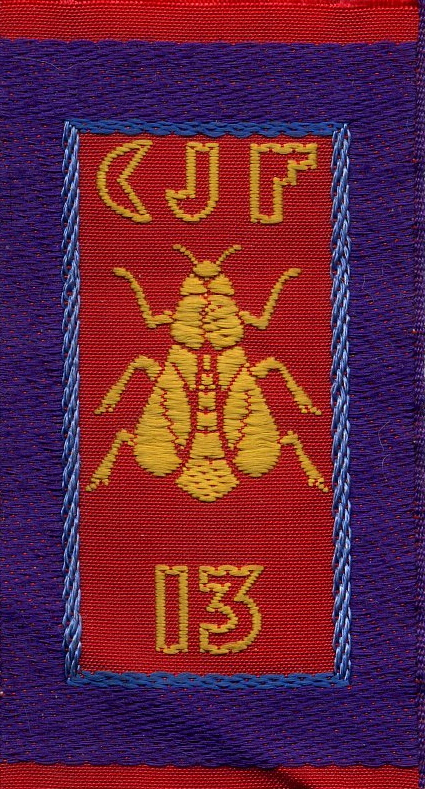
Insignia of CJF 13 (second model).

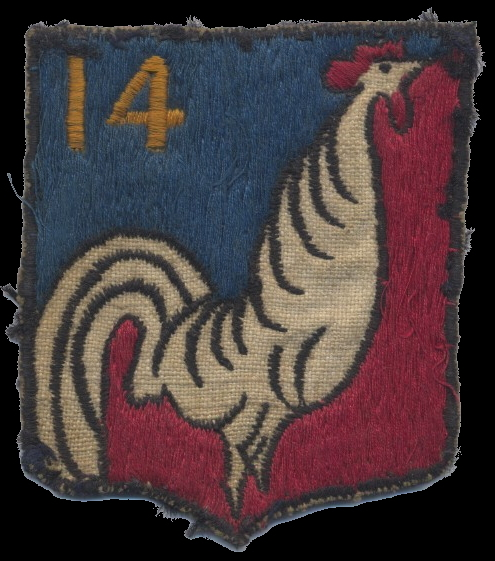
Insignia of CJF 14 (first model).

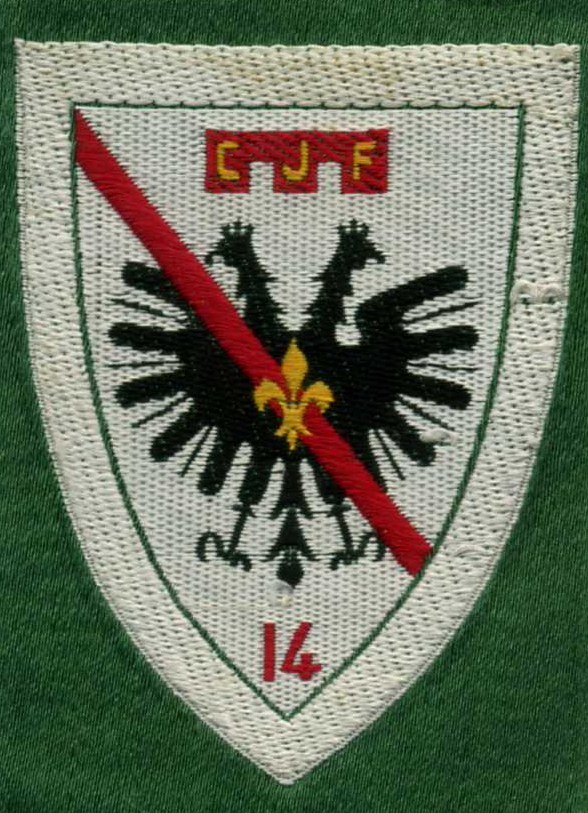
Insignia of CJF 14 (second model).

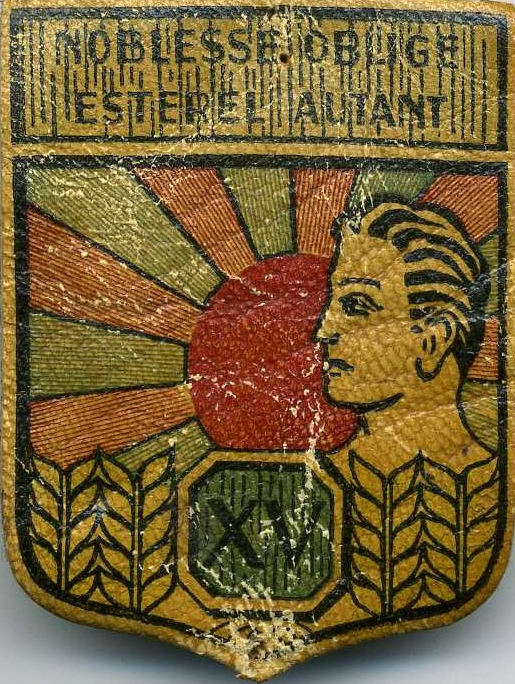
Insignia of CJF 15 (first model).

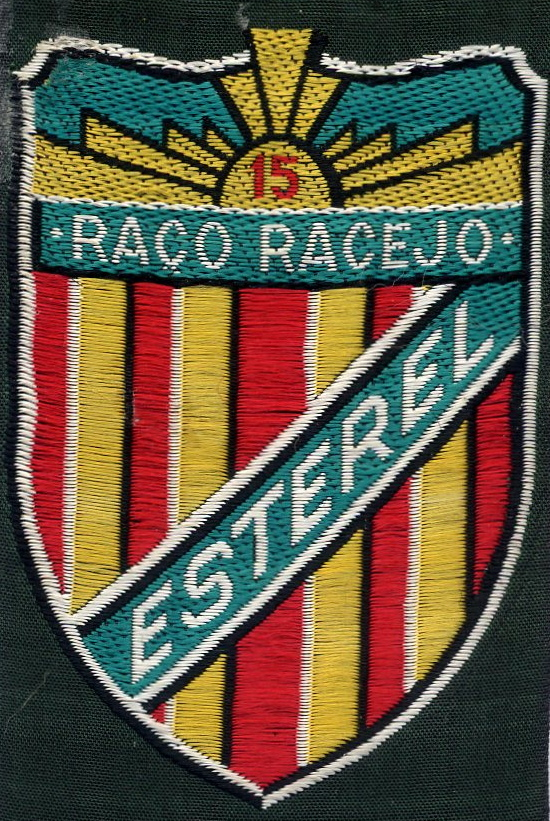
Insignia of CJF 15 (second model).

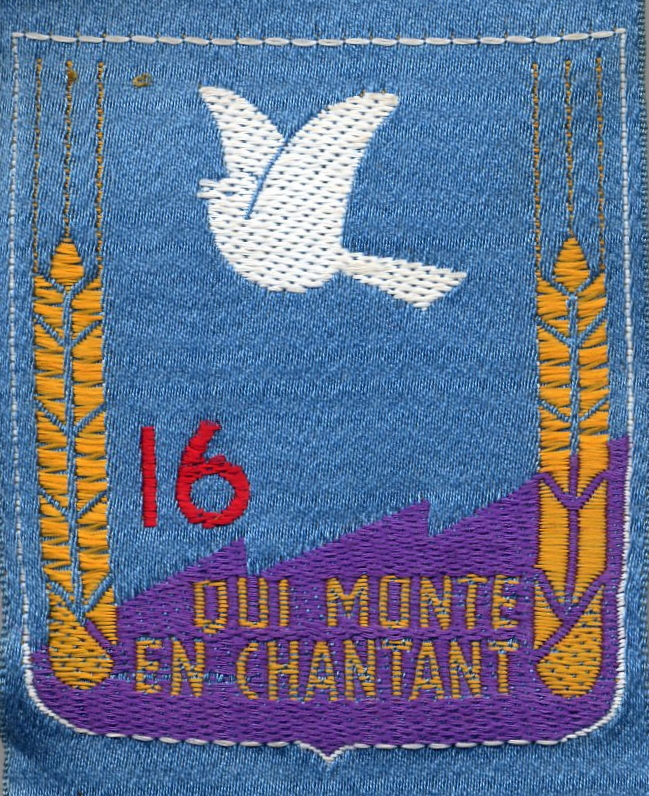
Insignia of CJF 16 (first model).

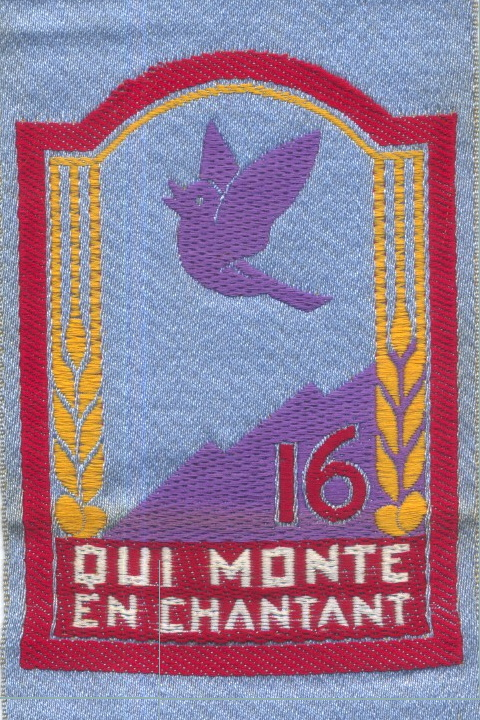
Insignia of CJF 16 (second model).

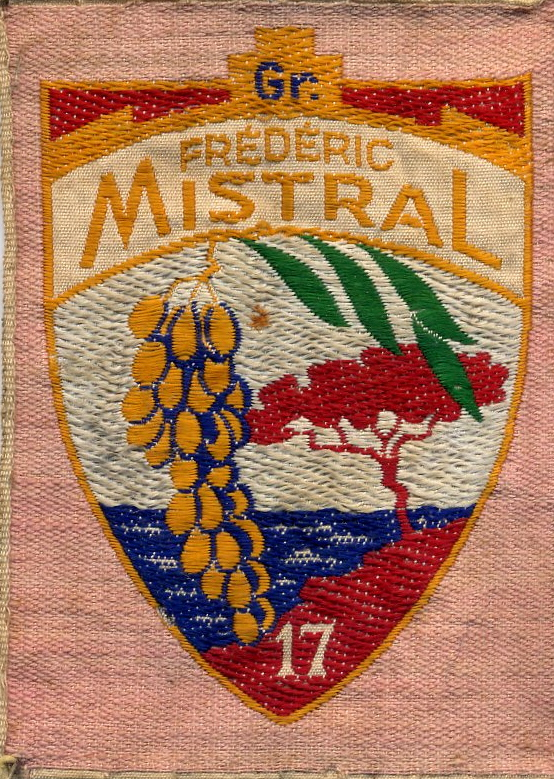
Insignia of CJF 17 (first model).

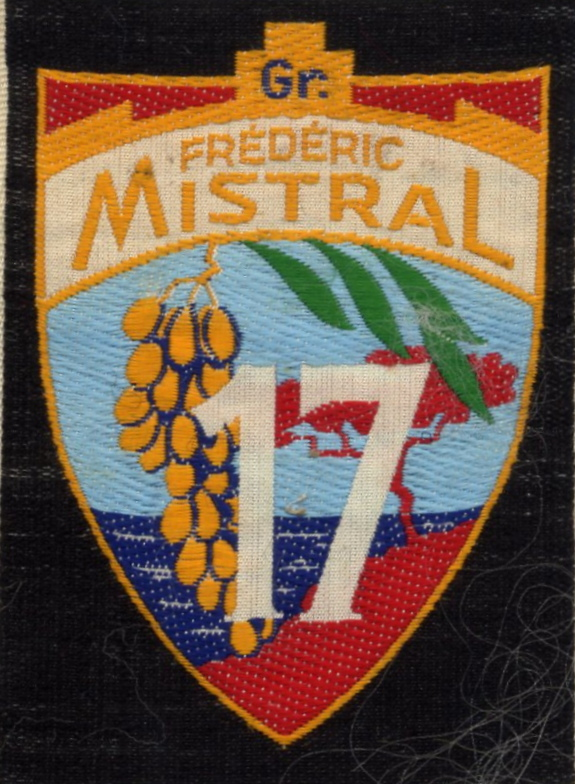
Insignia of CJF 17 (second model).

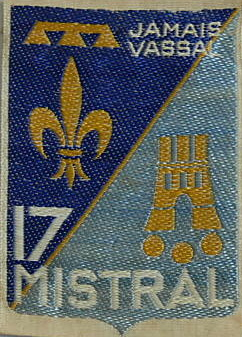
Insignia of CJF 17 (third model).

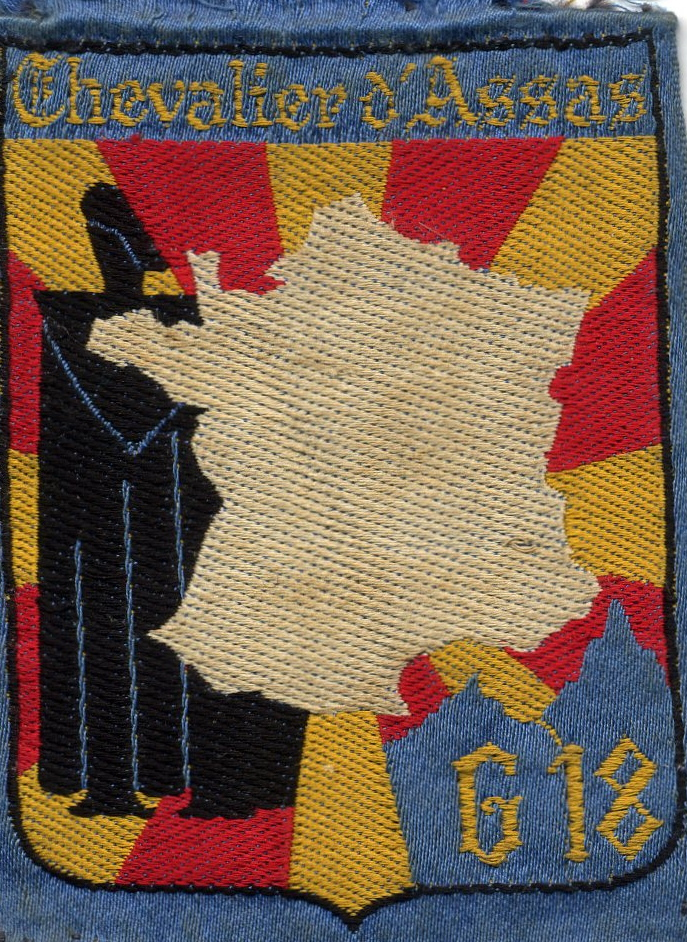
Insignia of CJF 18 (first model).

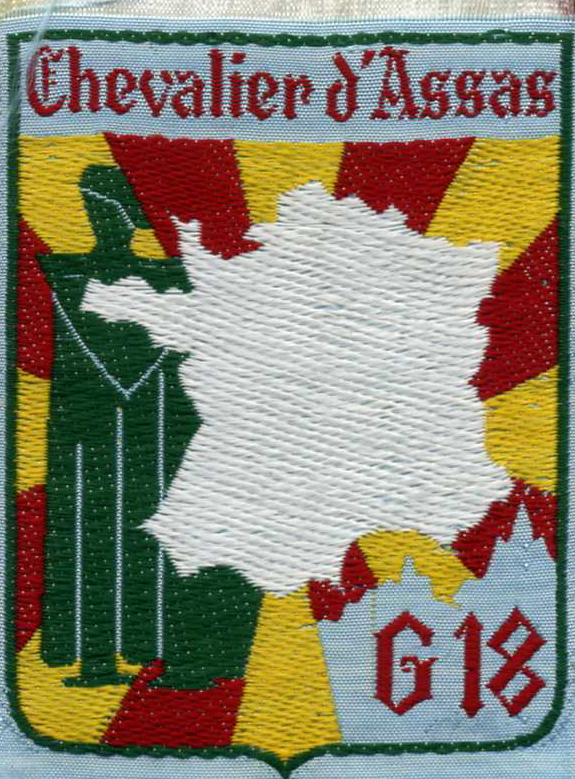
Insignia of CJF 18 (second model).

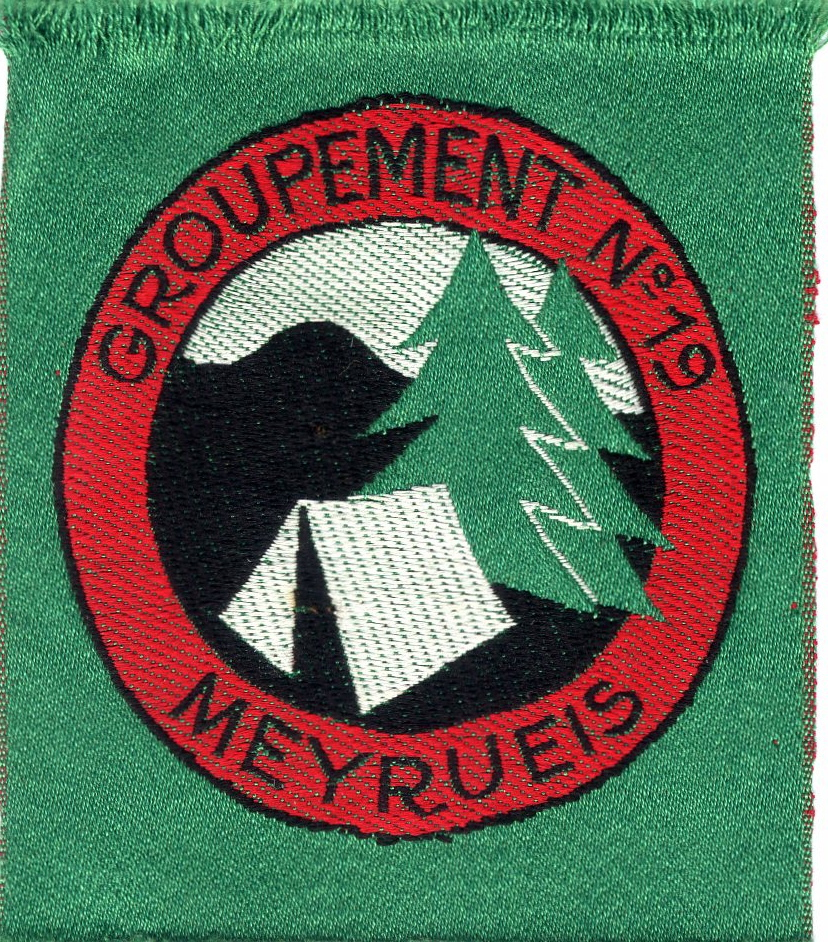
Insignia of CJF 19.

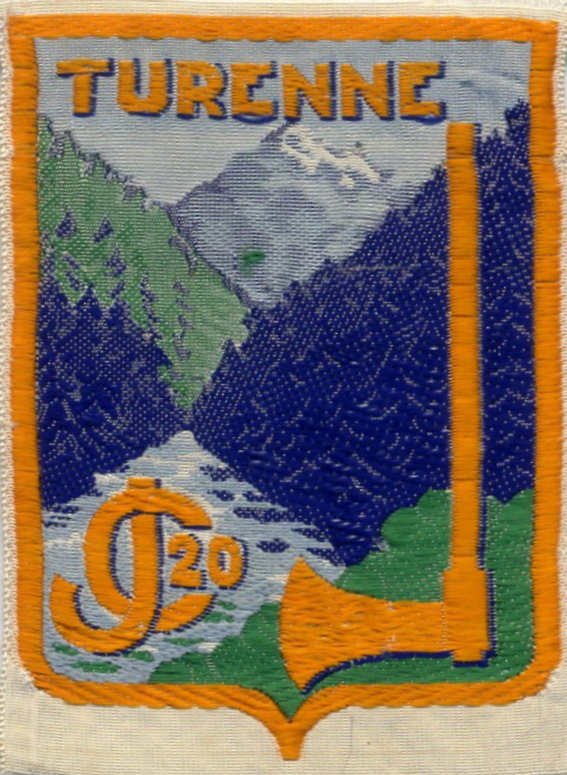
Insignia of CJF 20.

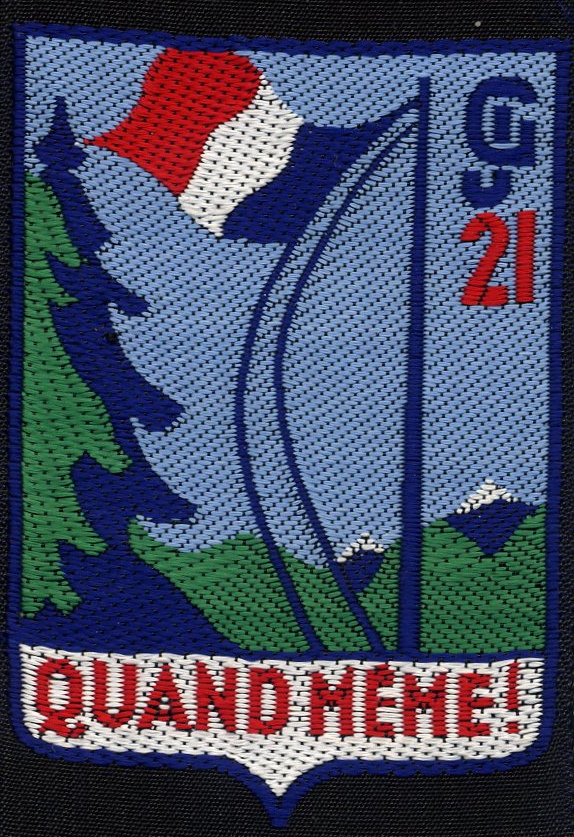
Insignia of CJF 21.

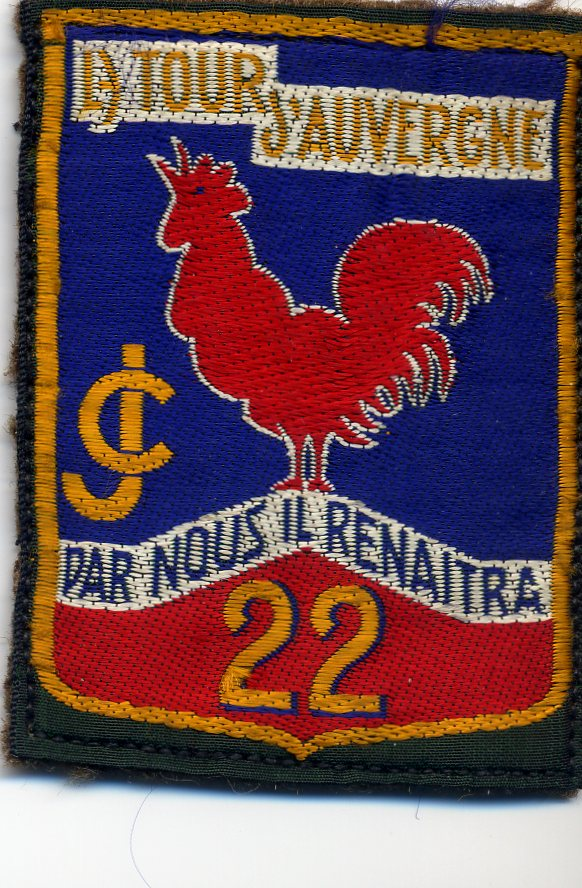
Insignia of CJF 22 (first model).

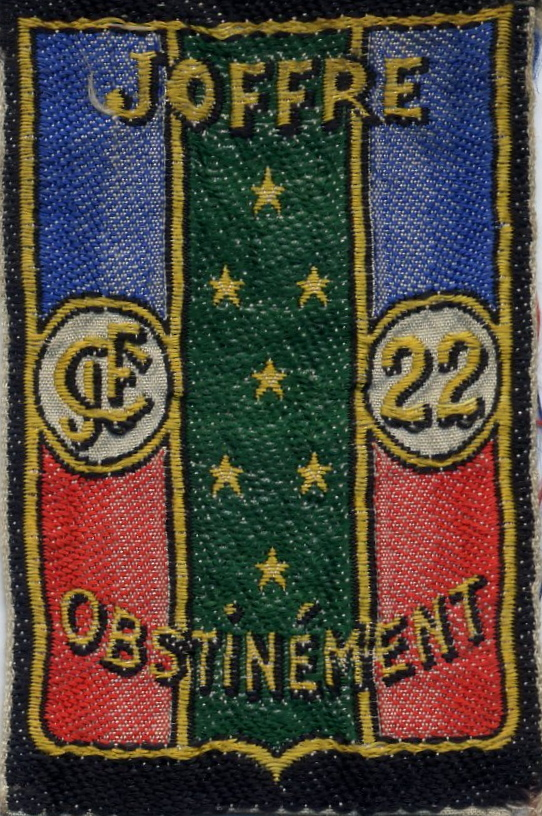
Insignia of CJF 22 (second model).

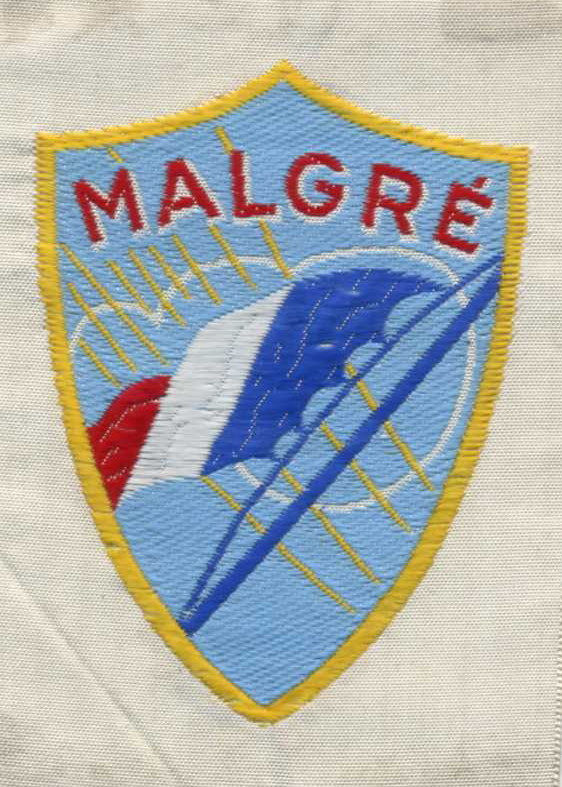
Insignia of CJF 23 (first model).

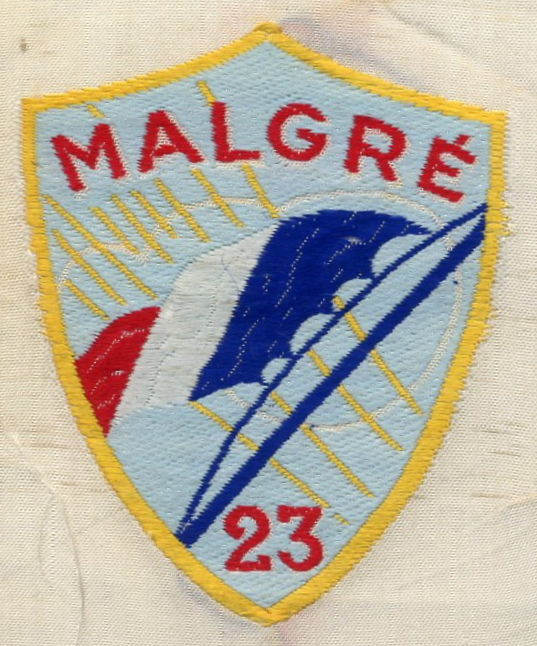
Insignia of CJF 23 (second model).

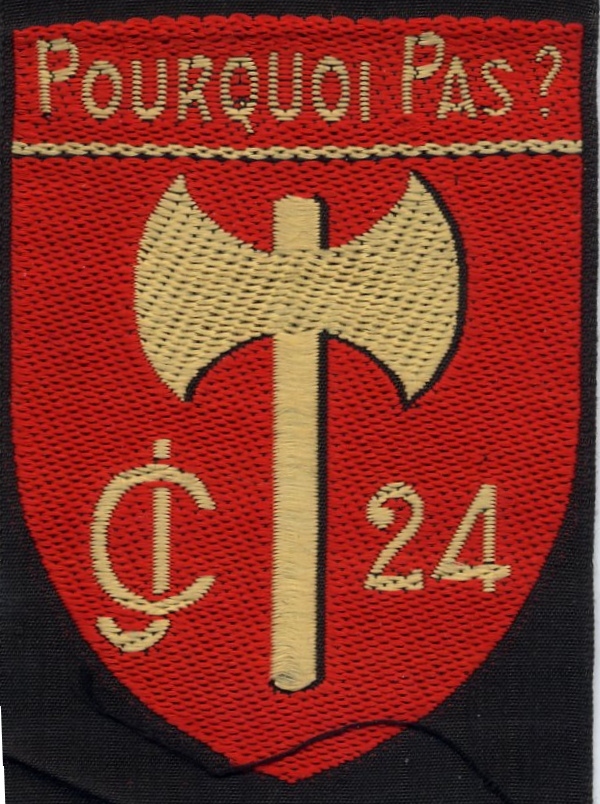
Insignia of CJF 24.

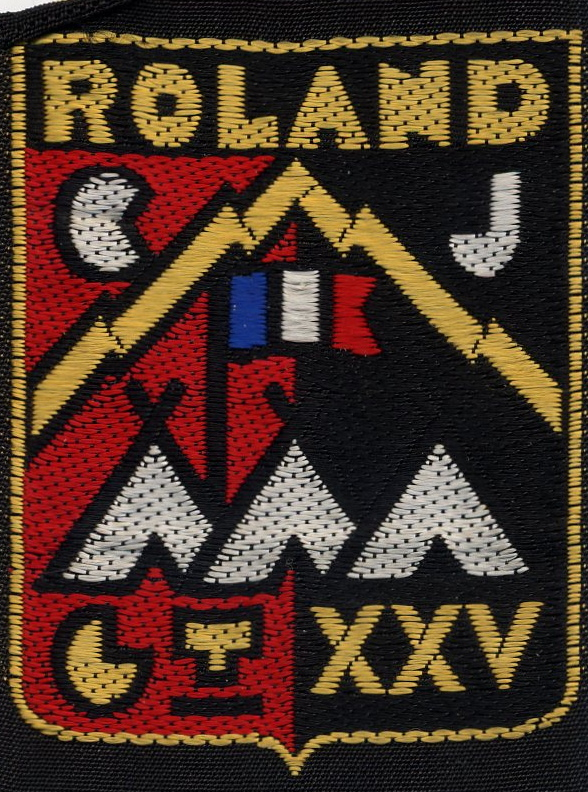
Insignia of CJF 25.

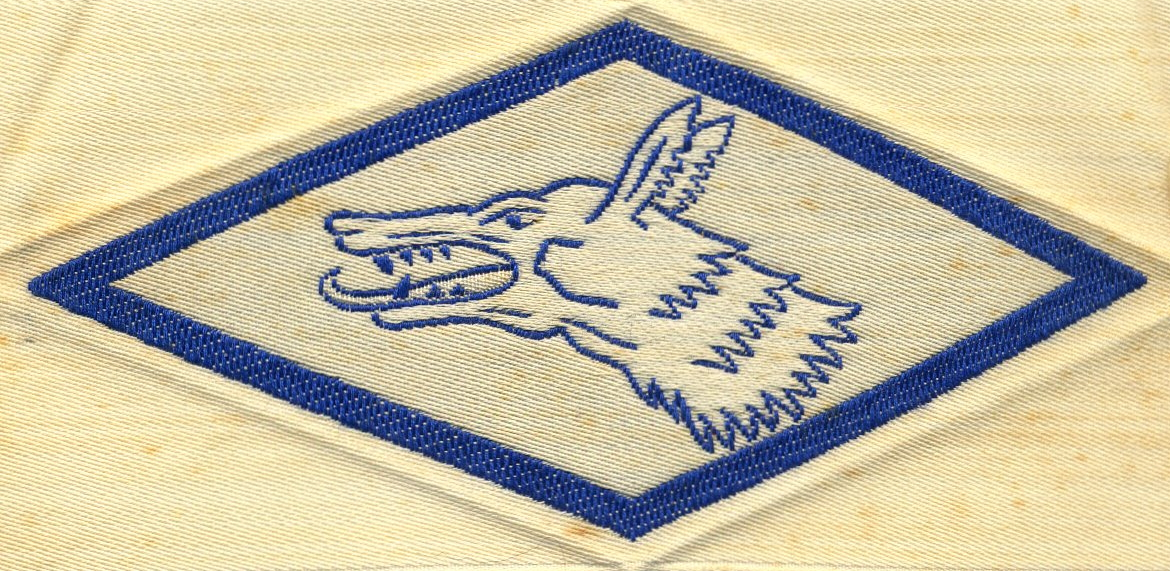
Insignia of CJF 26 (first model).

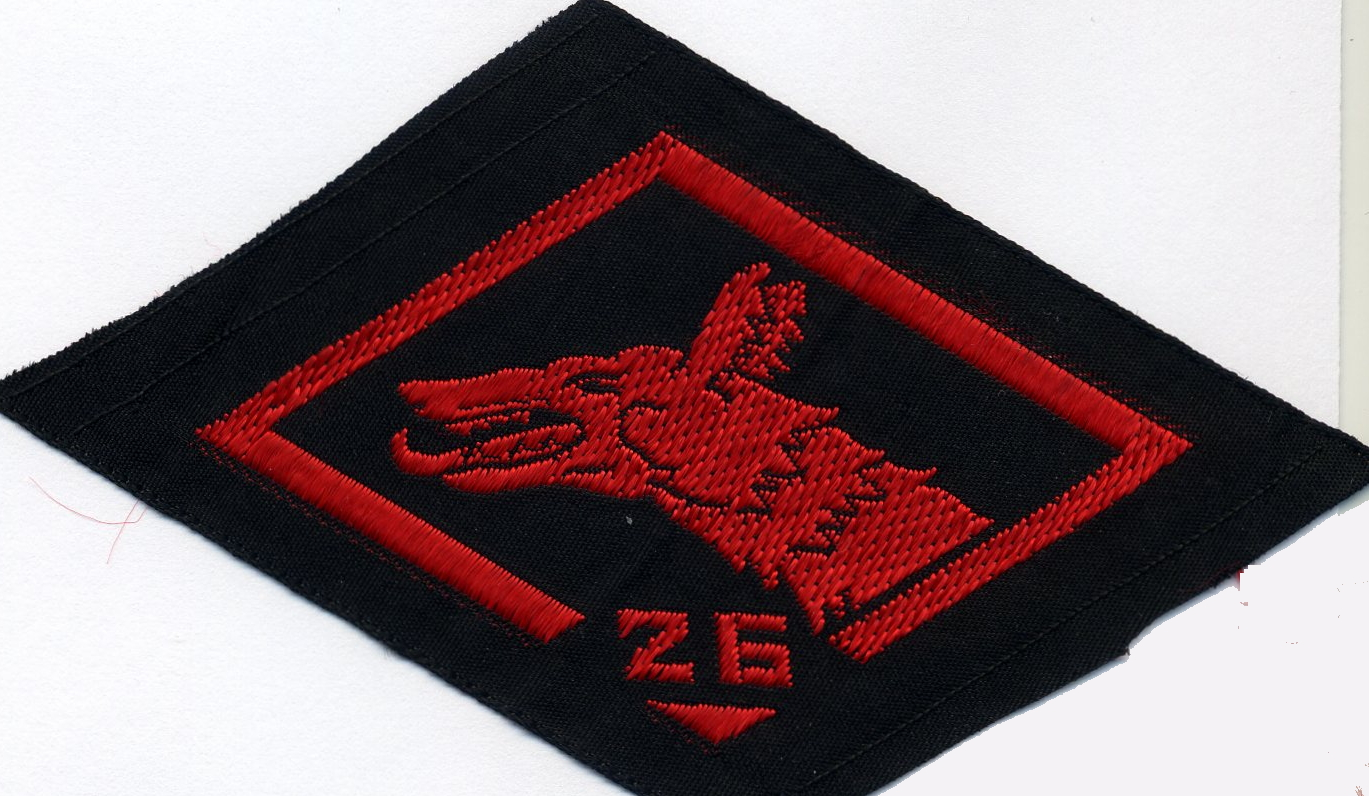
Insignia of CJF 26 (second model).

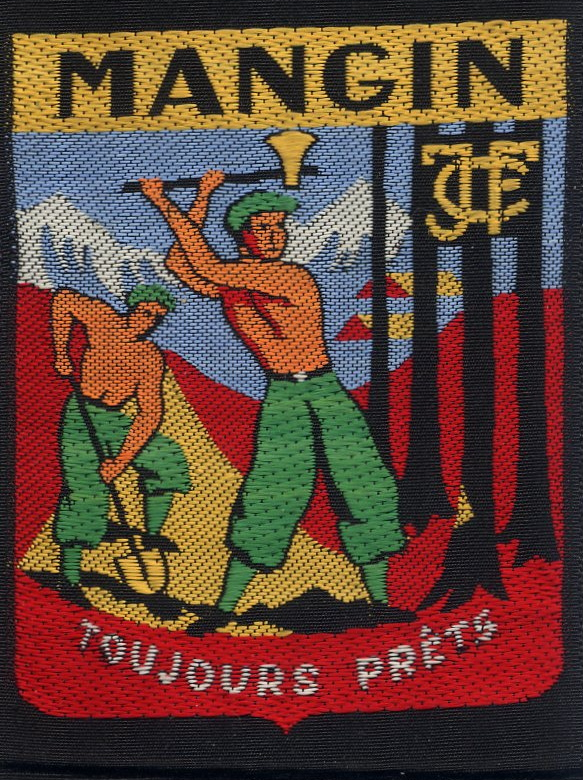
Insignia of CJF 27 (first model).

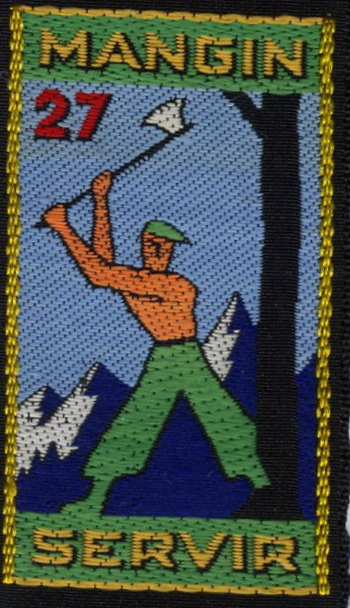
Insignia of CJF 27 (second model).

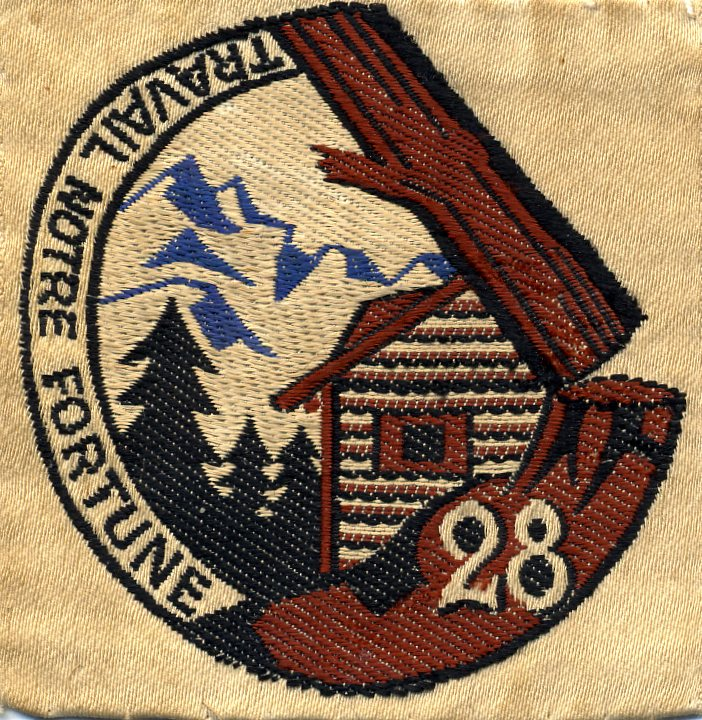
Insignia of CJF 28.

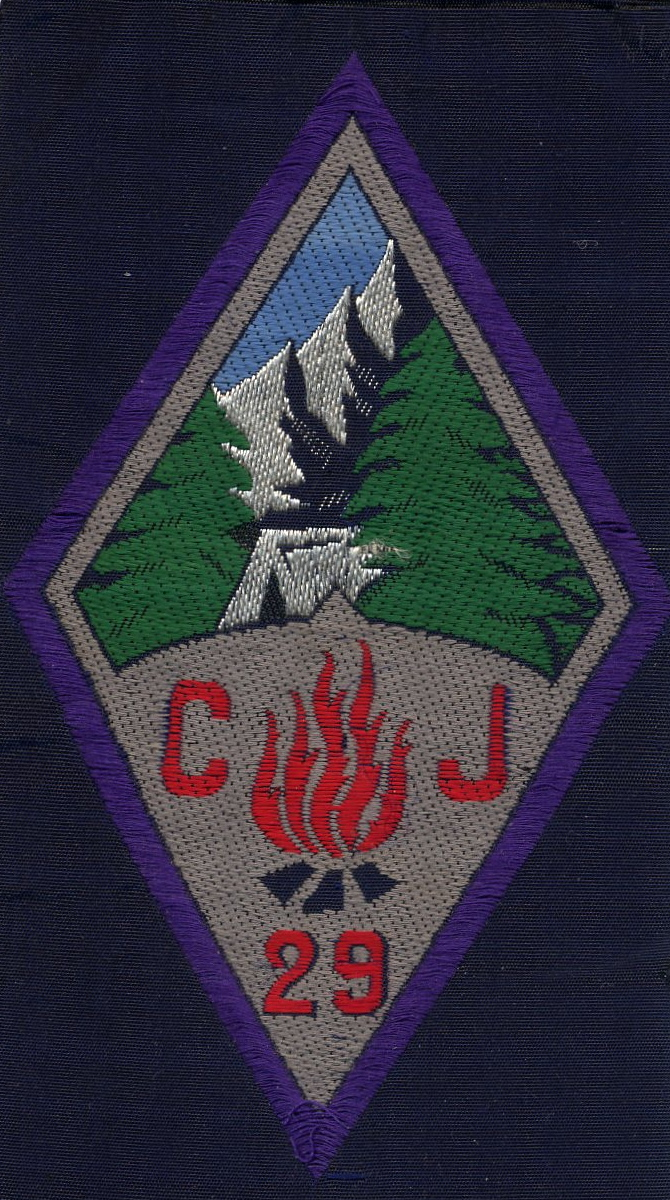
Insignia of CJF 29.

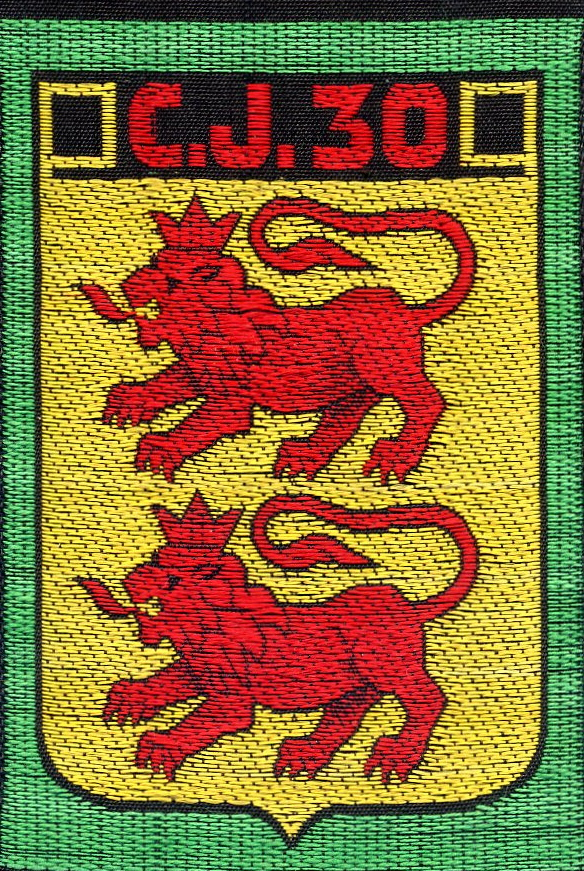
Insignia of CJF 30.

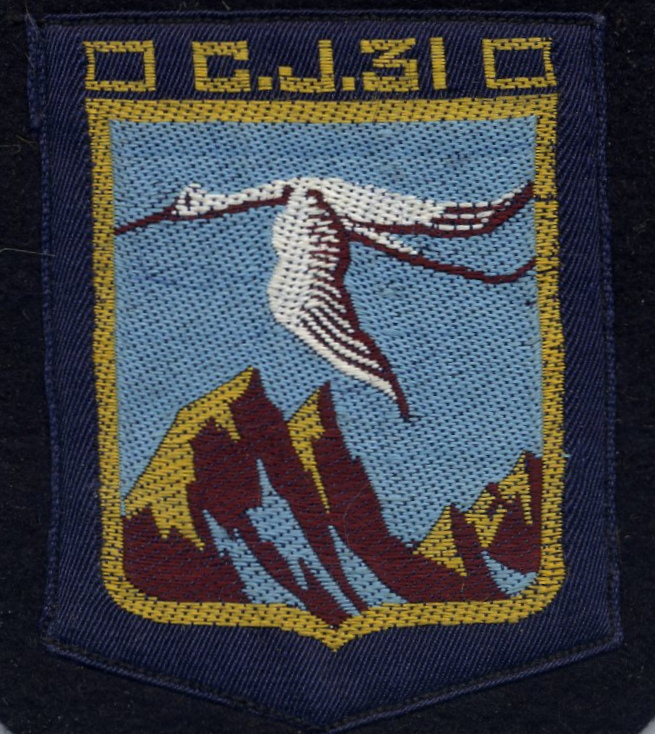
Insignia of CJF 31 (first model).

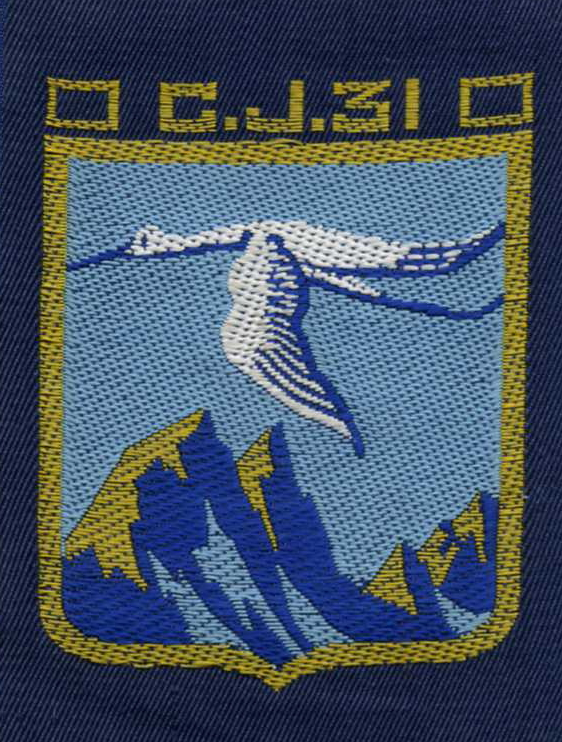
Insignia of CJF 31 (second model).

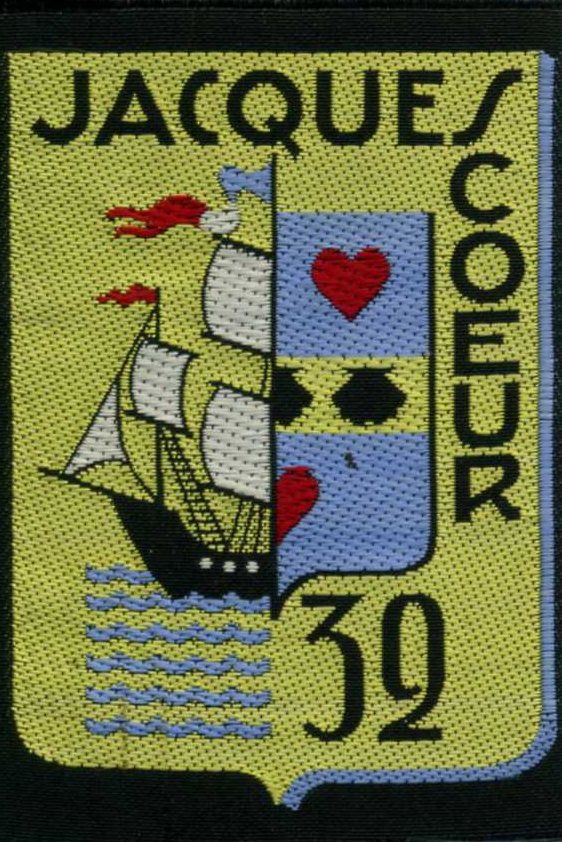
Insignia of CJF 32 (first model).

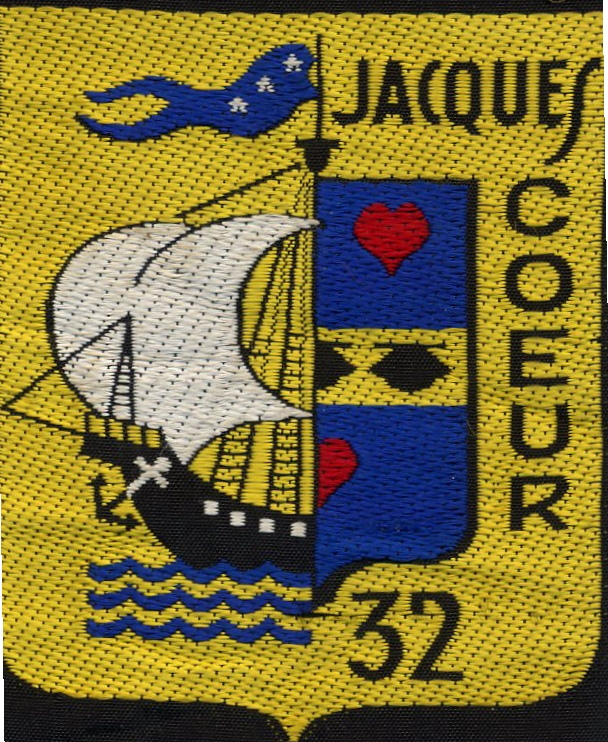
Insignia of CJF 32 (second model).

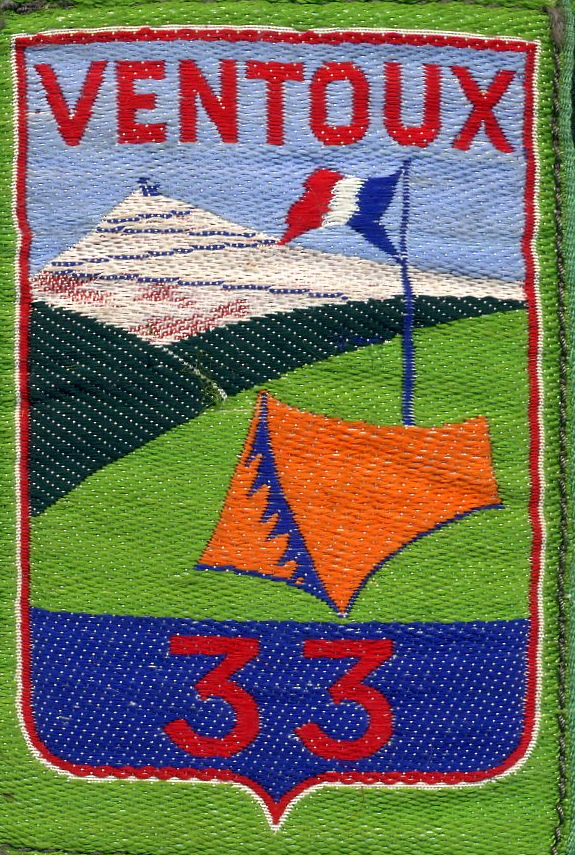
Insignia of CJF 33 (first model).

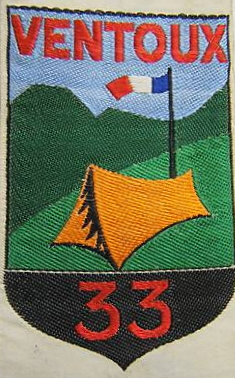
Insignia of CJF 33 (second model).

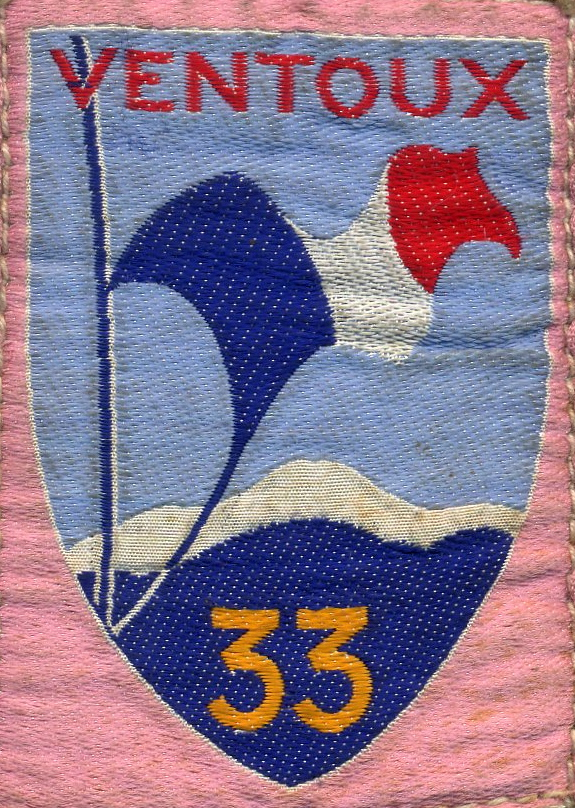
Insignia of CJF 33 (third model).

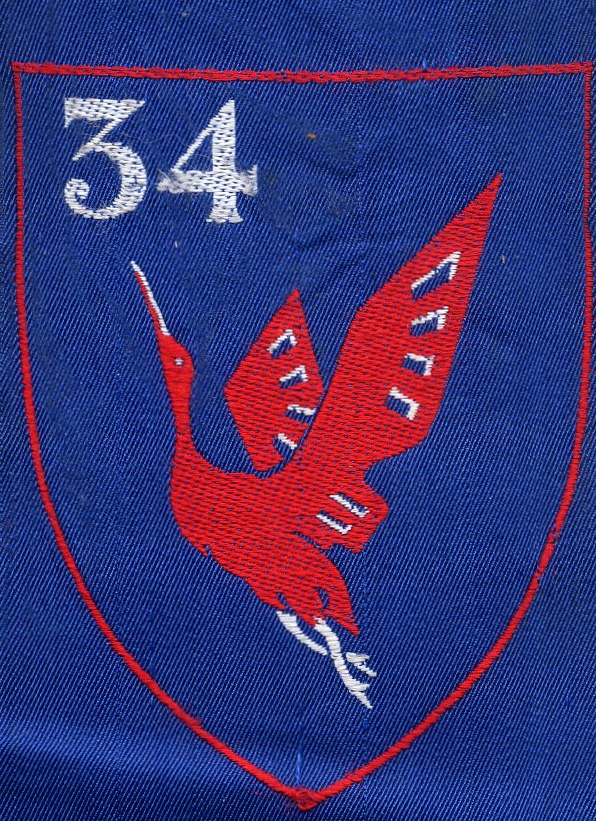
Insignia of CJF 34.

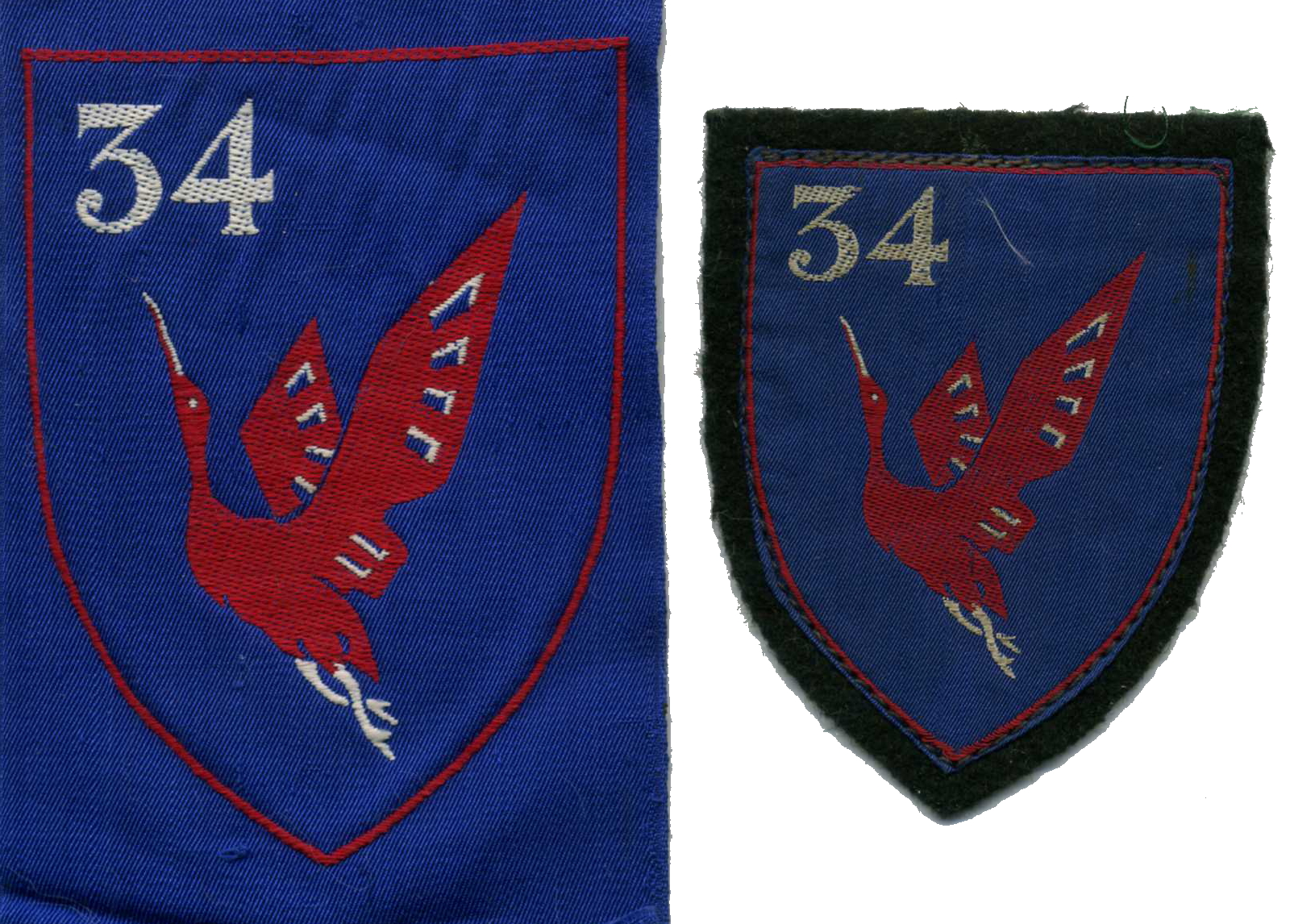
Insignia of CJF 34.

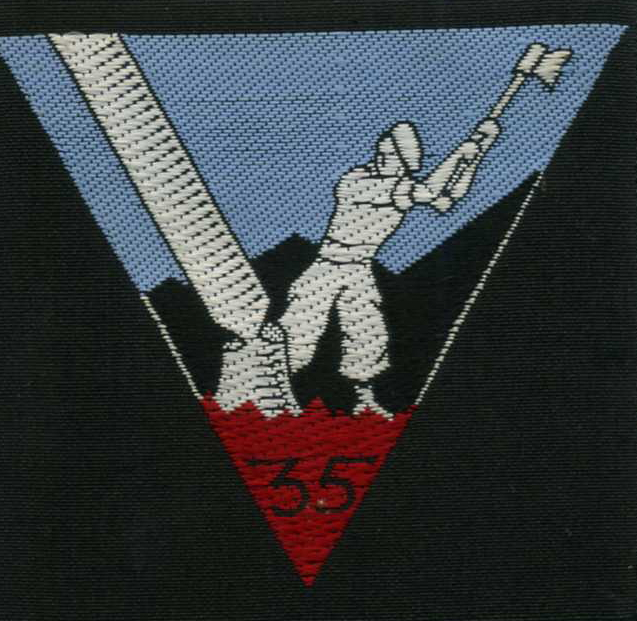
Insignia of CJF 35 (first model).

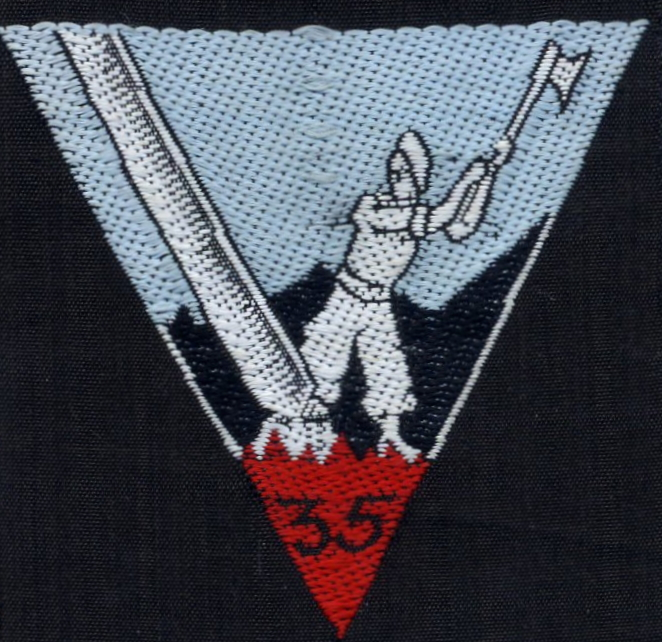
Insignia of CJF 35 (second model).

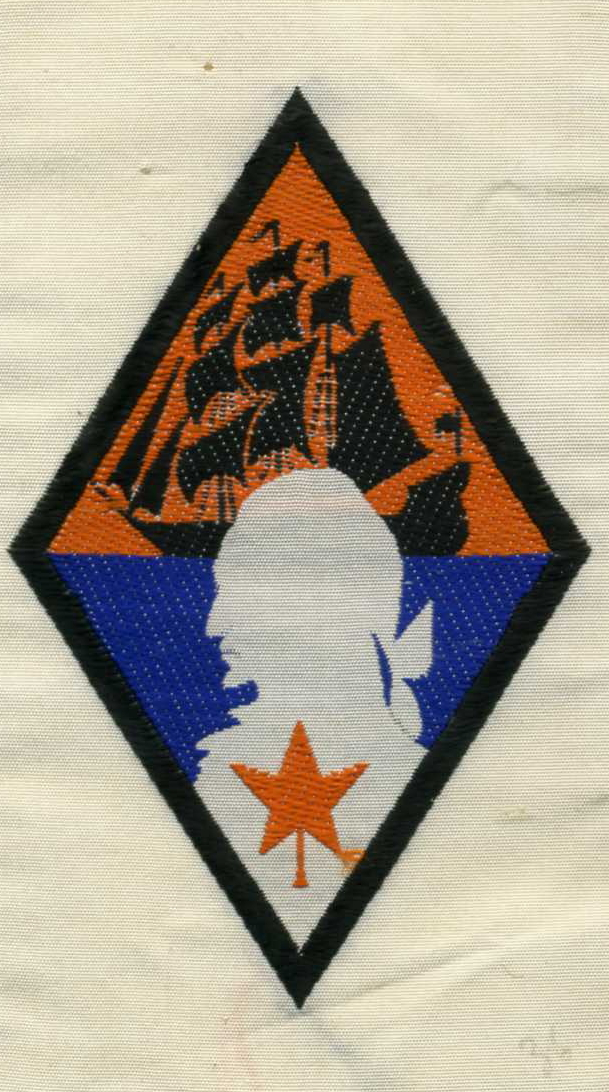
Insignia of CJF 36 (first model).

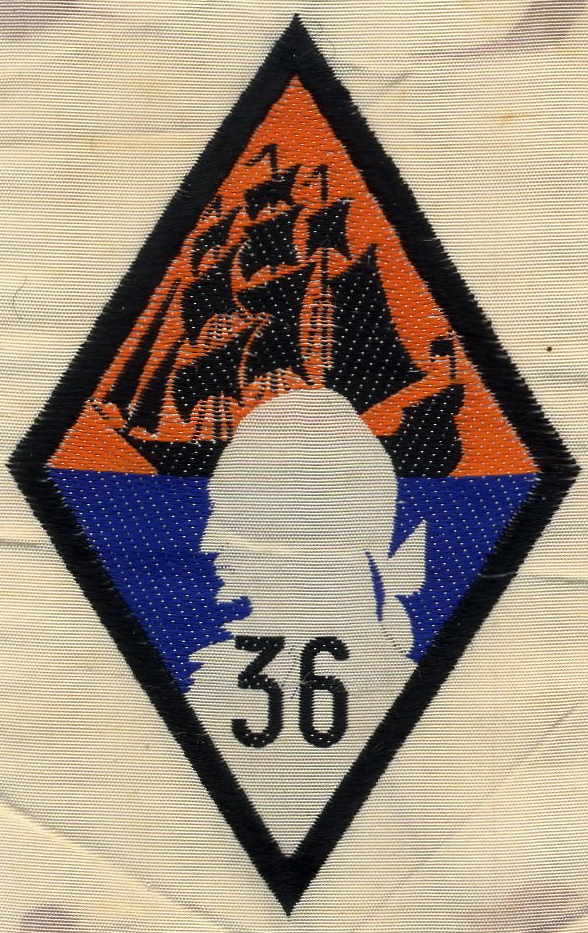
Insignia of CJF 36 (second model).

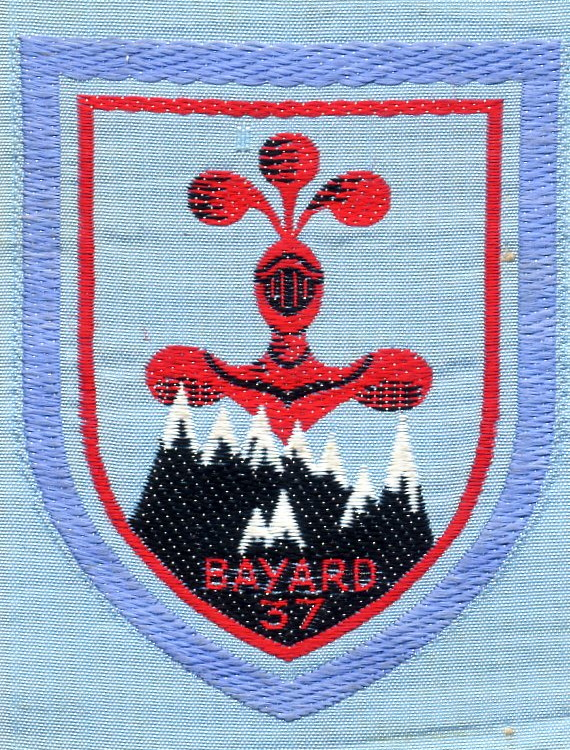
Insignia of CJF 37 (second model - missing first model).

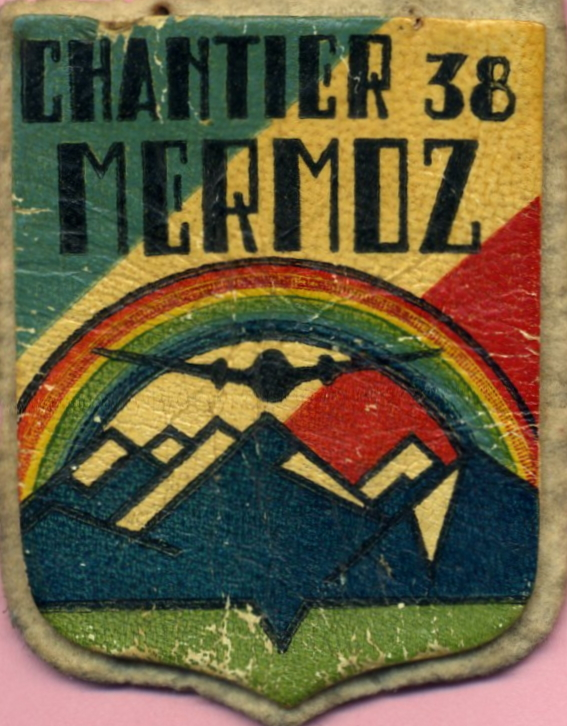
Insignia of CJF 38 (first model).

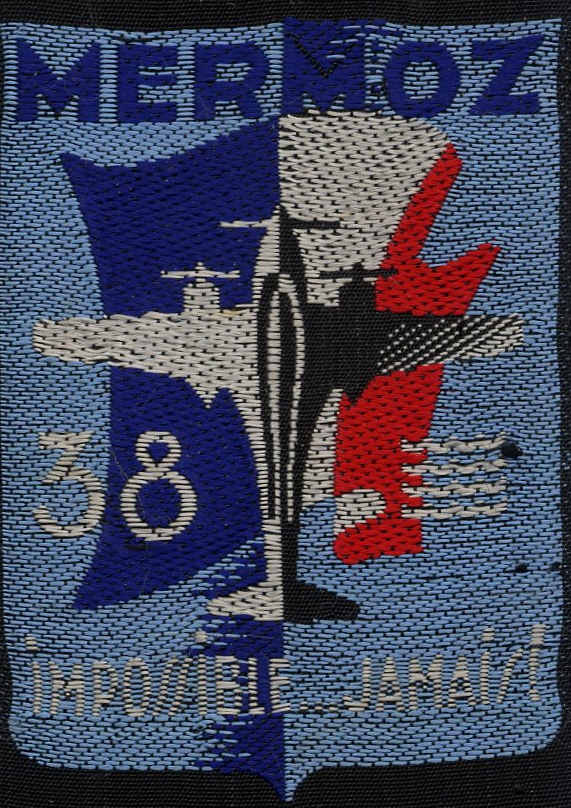
Insignia of CJF 38 - 4 waves - (second model).

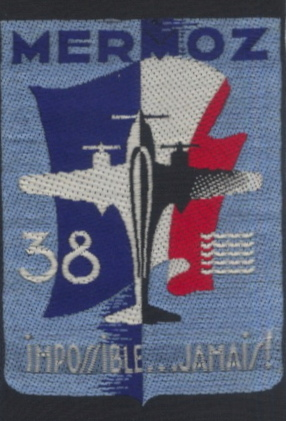
Insignia of CJF 38 - 5 waves - (second model).

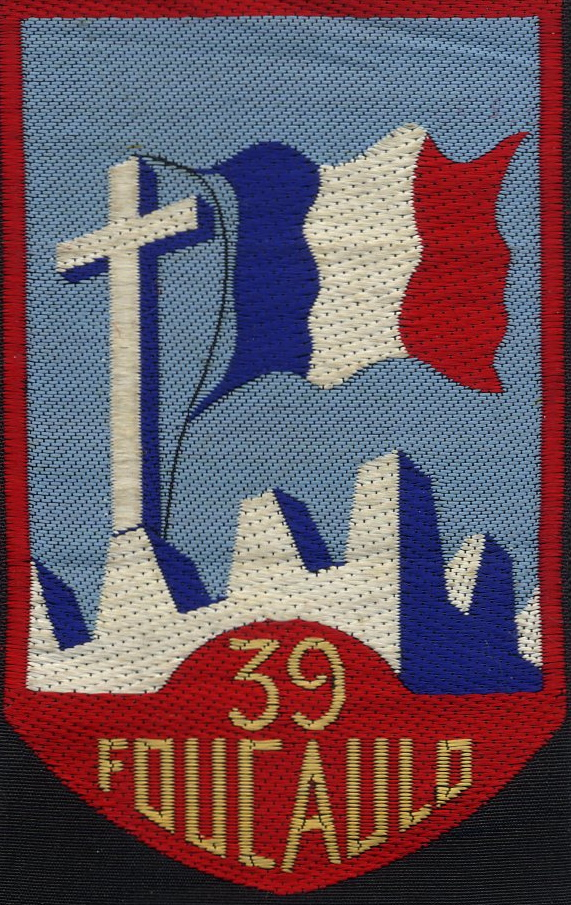
Insignia of CJF 39.

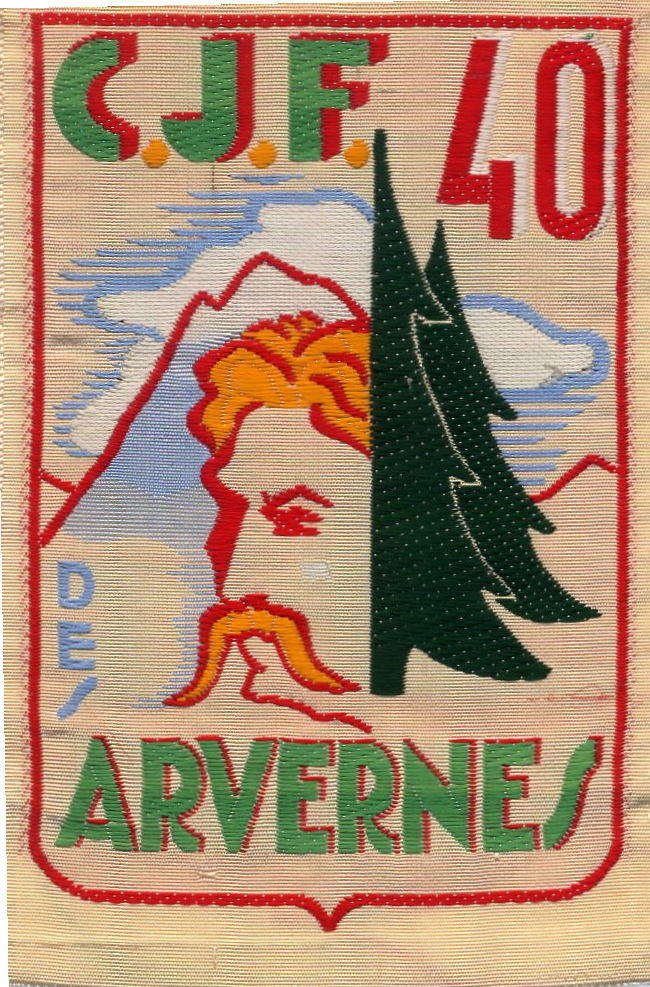
Insignia of CJF 40 (first model).

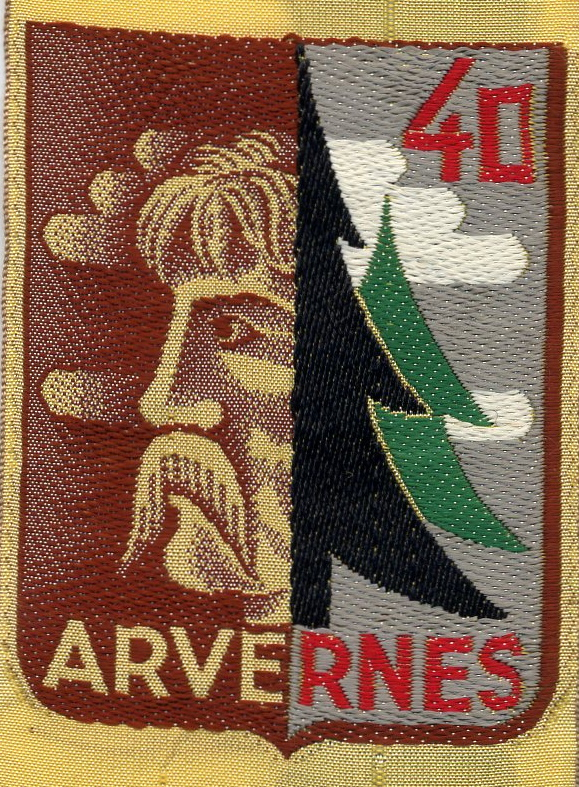
Insignia of CJF 40 (second model).

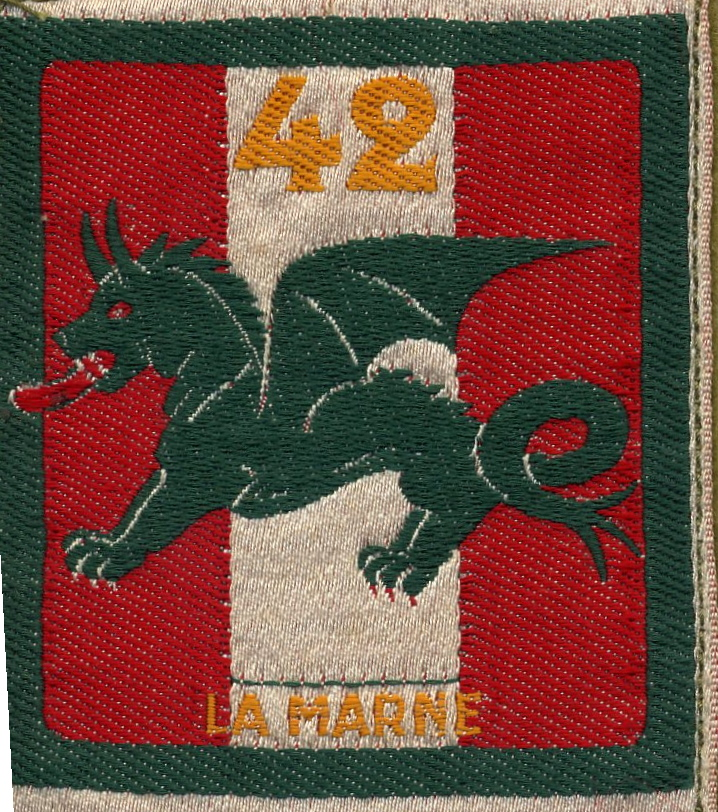
Insignia of CJF 42.

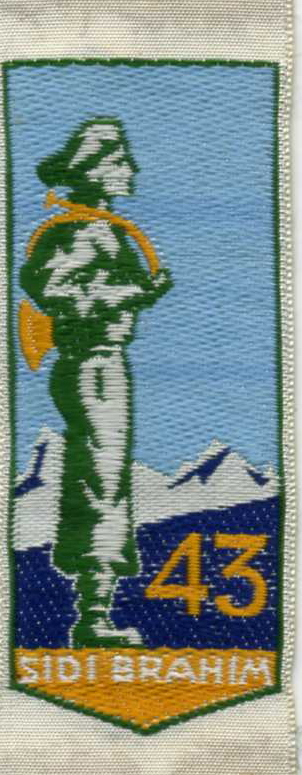
Insignia of CJF 43 (first model).

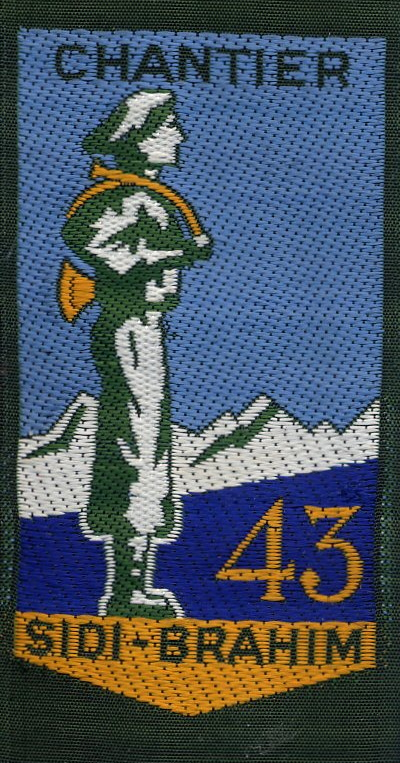
Insignia of CJF 43 (second model).

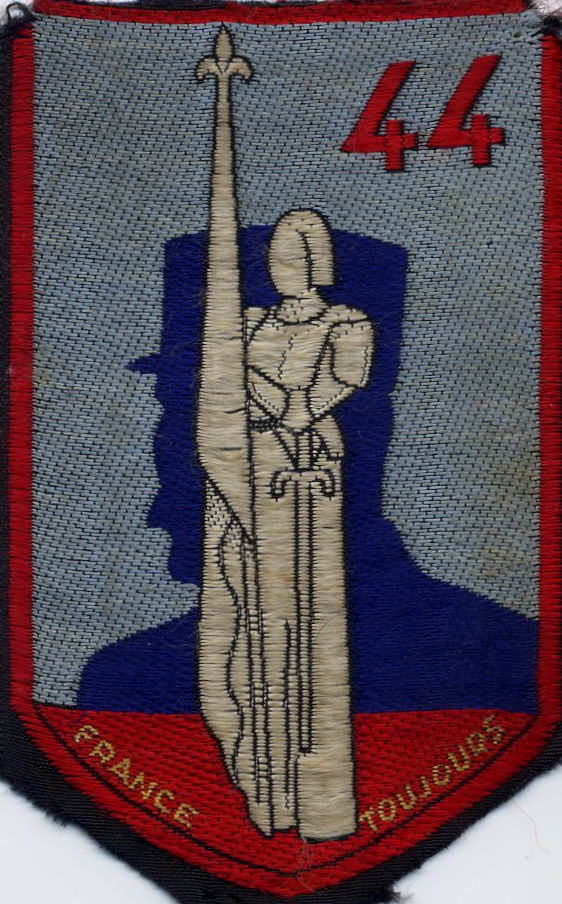
Insignia of CJF 44.

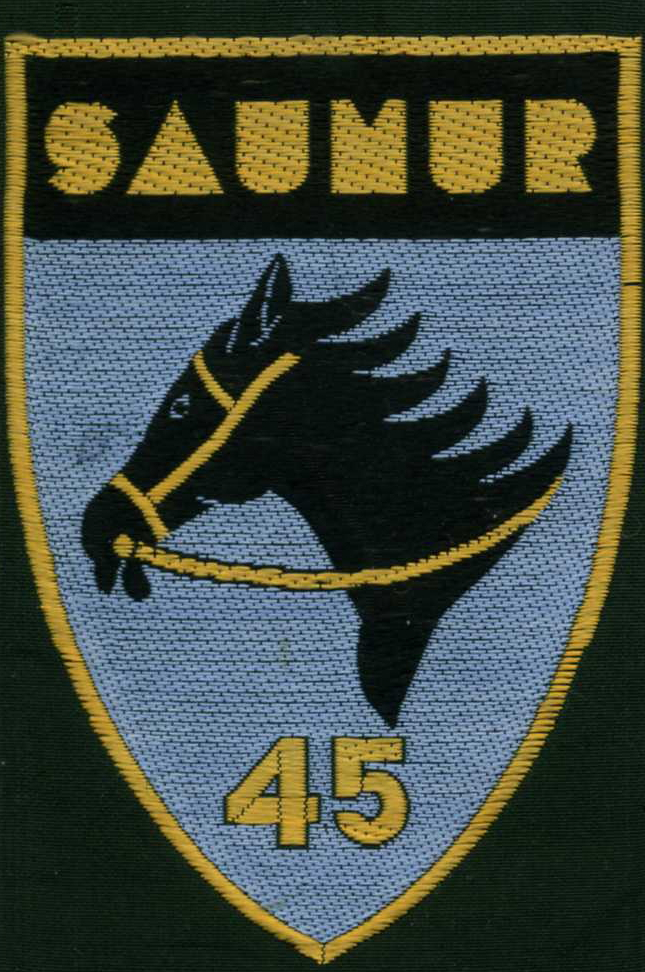
Insignia of CJF 45 (first model).

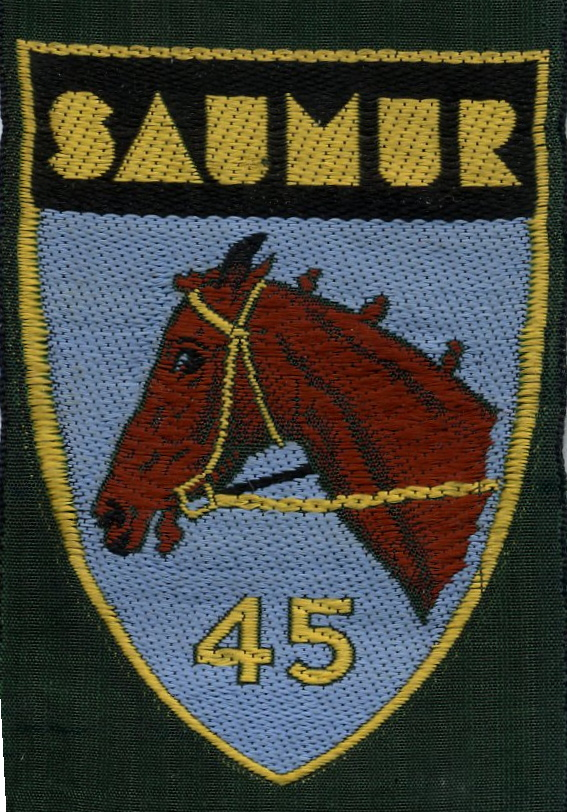
Insignia of CJF 45 (second model).

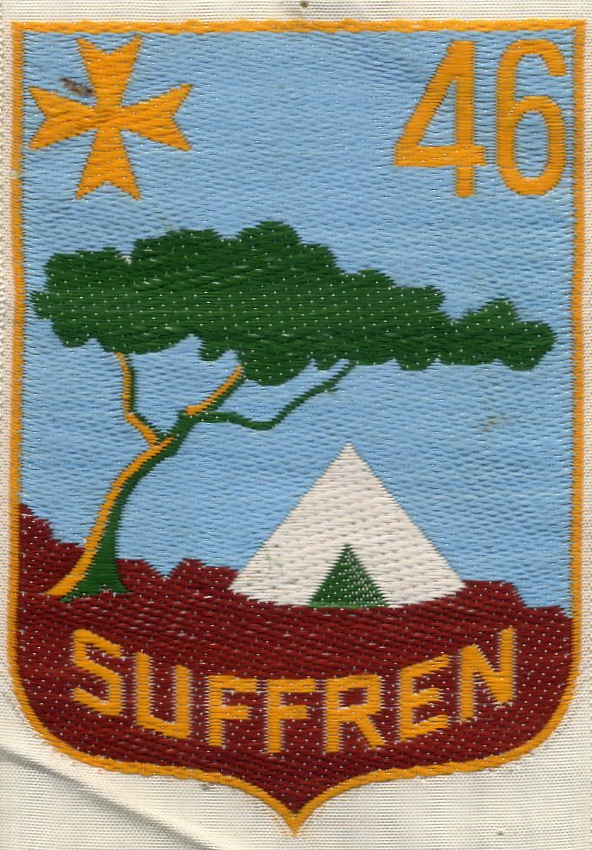
Insignia of CJF 46 (first model, blue background variant).

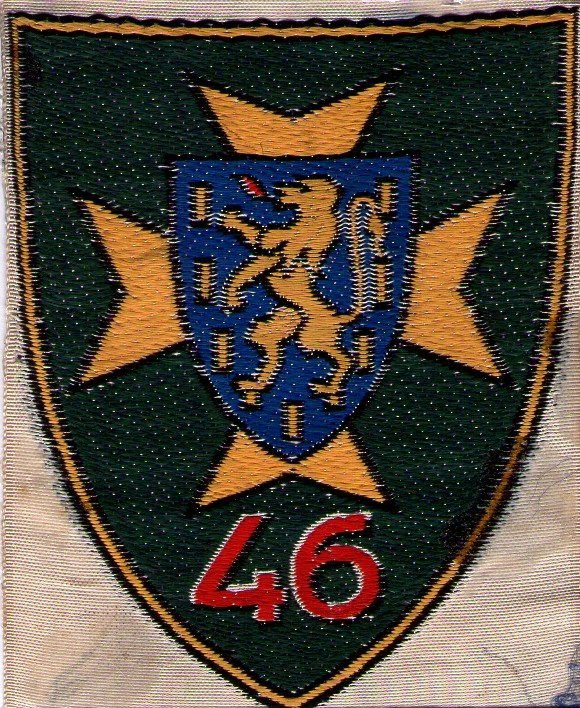
Insignia of CJF 46 (second model).

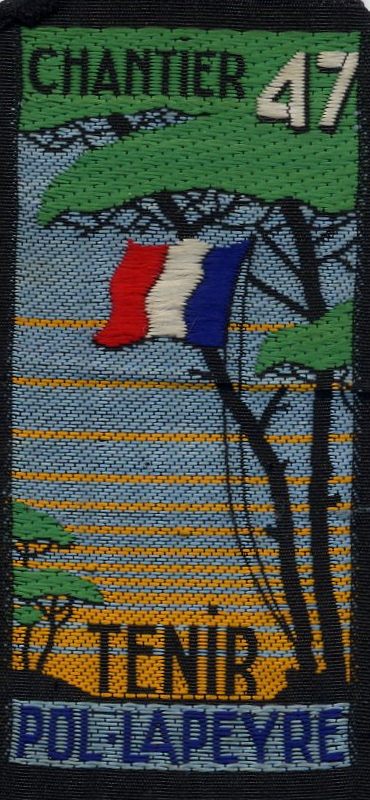
Insignia of CJF 47.

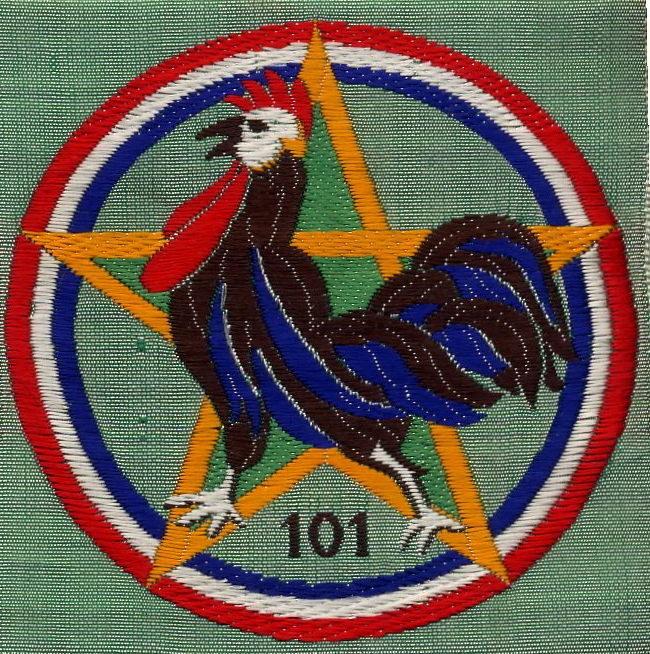
Insignia of CJF 101.

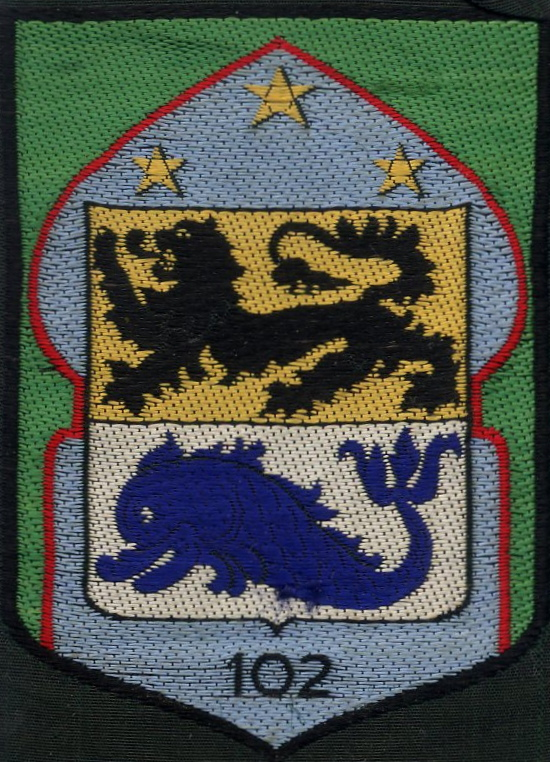
Insignia of CJF 102.

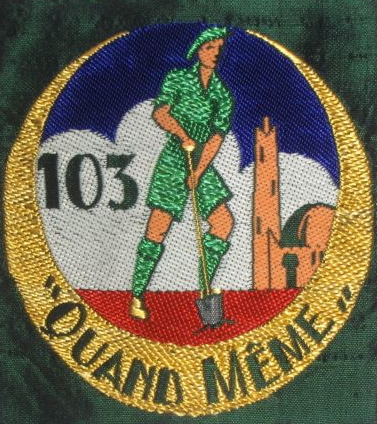
Insignia of CJF 103.

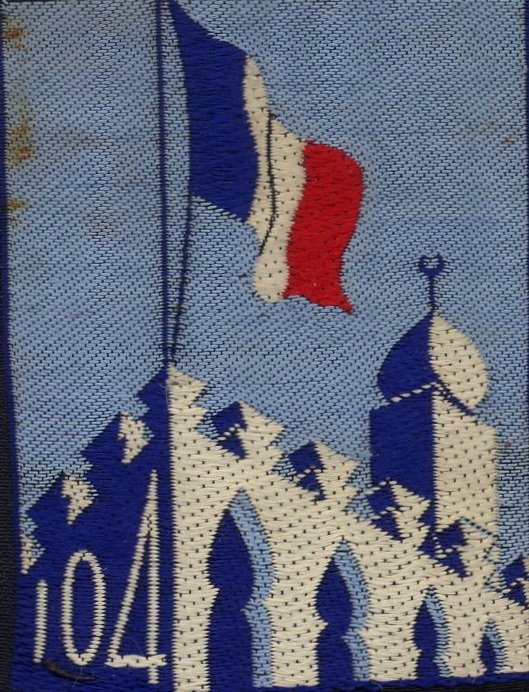
Insignia of CJF 104 (first model with number).

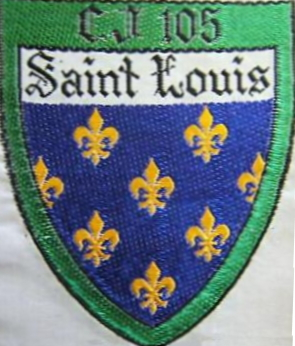
Insignia of CJF 105 (first model with number).

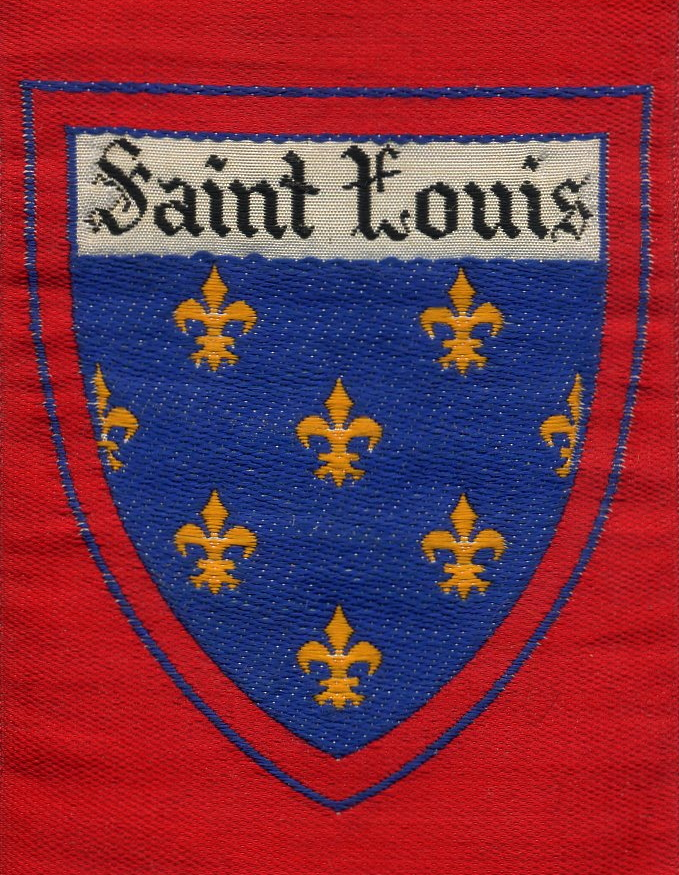
Insignia of CJF 105 (second model without number).

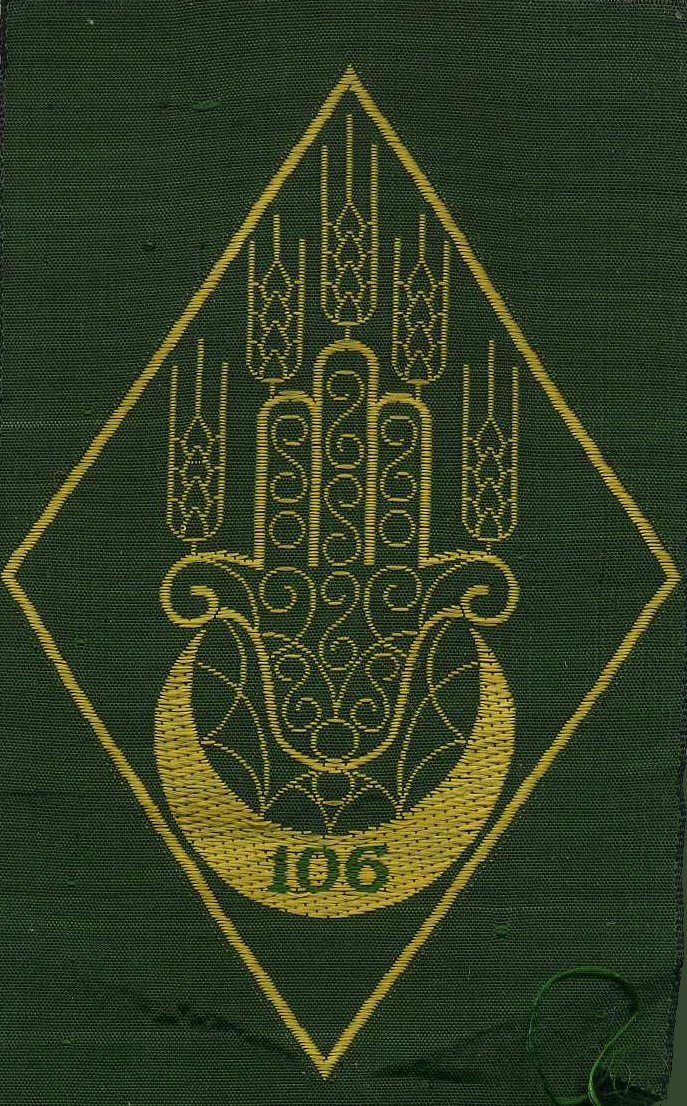
Insignia of CJF 106.

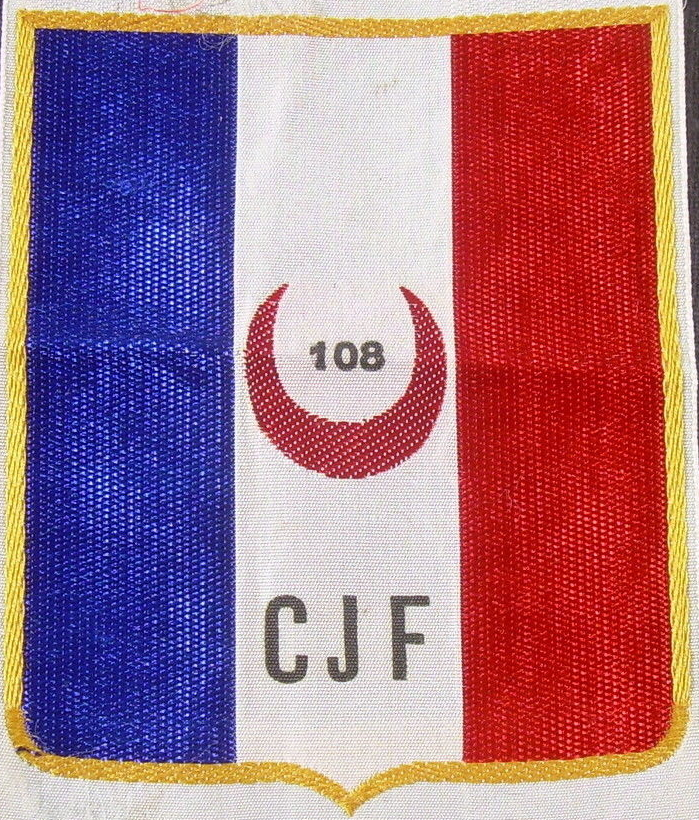
Insignia of Tunisian riflemen used by CJF 108.

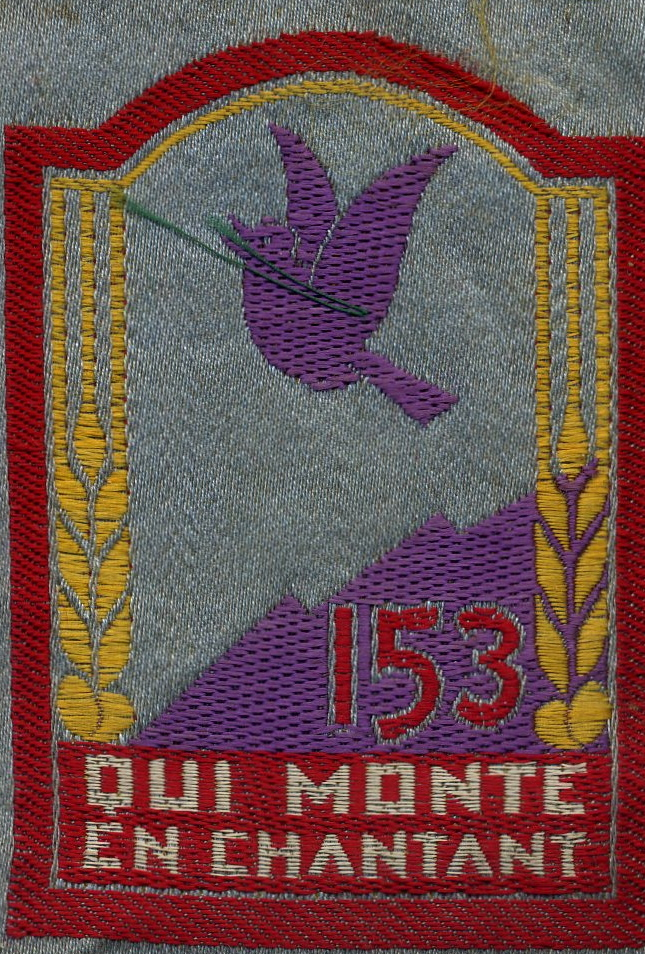
Insignia of CJF 153.

Metal Insignia of Groups

Like the fabric insignia, metal insignia exist for the general insignia, in several models; for each group (some groups have multiple models); in most cases, for each team. Some groups did not have metal team insignia. These insignia come in several sizes and models.

Sizes

A very large model for leaders, as in Group 26, and apparently for each team: the dimension is 40 mm in diameter. A normal model for all personnel, for Group 26 and for the teams of this group: the dimension is 32 mm in diameter. A model intended to be worn on the beret in place of the fabric insignia, for Group 26, each team seems to have had, in its team color, a beret insignia: the dimension is 26 mm in diameter.

Models

Traditional enameled on a metal base, brass or other metal. Painted on a heavy metal base. Painted on aluminum. Entirely metal, without enamel or paint. Some models in aluminum with an enameled part: for example, Group 34, 5th team “L’Arminier-Lahire”. Very rarely enameled on silver.

Team colors

By order of the Official Periodic Bulletin No. 12 of 7 published by the General Commissariat, each group was to embroider its insignia on a fabric or background of a different color depending on the team: Team 1: light blue background – Team 2: light red background – Team 3: jonquil (yellow) background – Team 4: light green background – Team 5: orange background – Team 6: brown background – Team 7: purple background – Team 8: gray background – Team 9: black background – Team 10: pink background – Direction Team (usually Team 11): white background.

In application of this directive, some groups (Nos. 1, 13, 14, 17, 25, 28, 29, 30, 33, 37, and 105) had their insignia woven directly with the regulatory background color. In other groups, the insignia (with an invariable background) was sewn onto a piece of cloth in the regulatory color corresponding to the team, some others put a color border on their insignia to differentiate the teams (see below the example of Group 29), finally, there were also groups where this directive was not applied.

Fabric insignia of teams

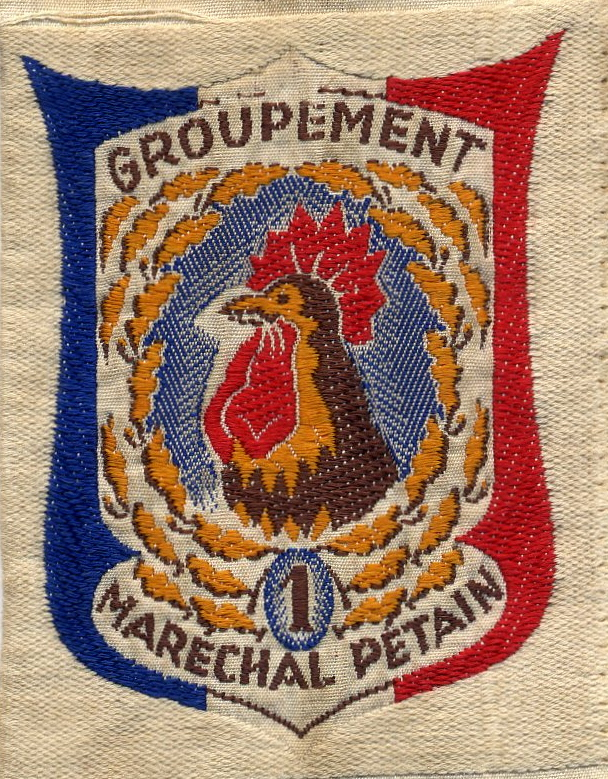
Insignia of CJF 1 - Direction Team.

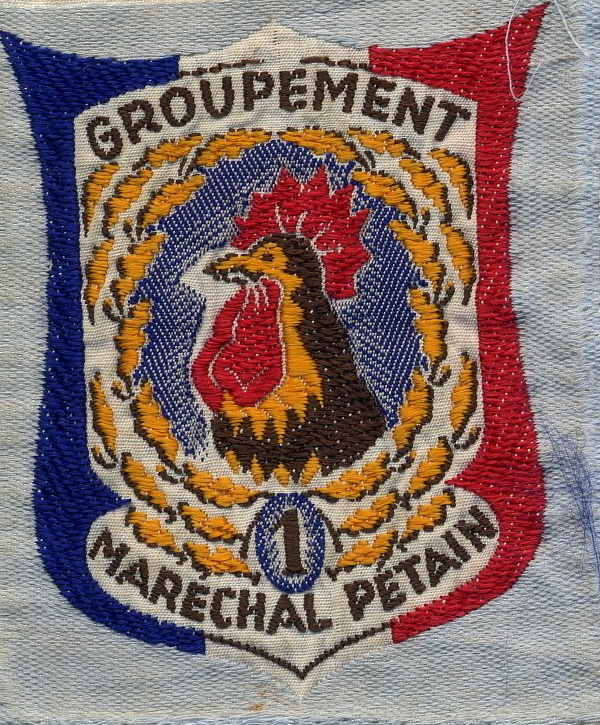
Insignia of CJF 1 - Team 1.

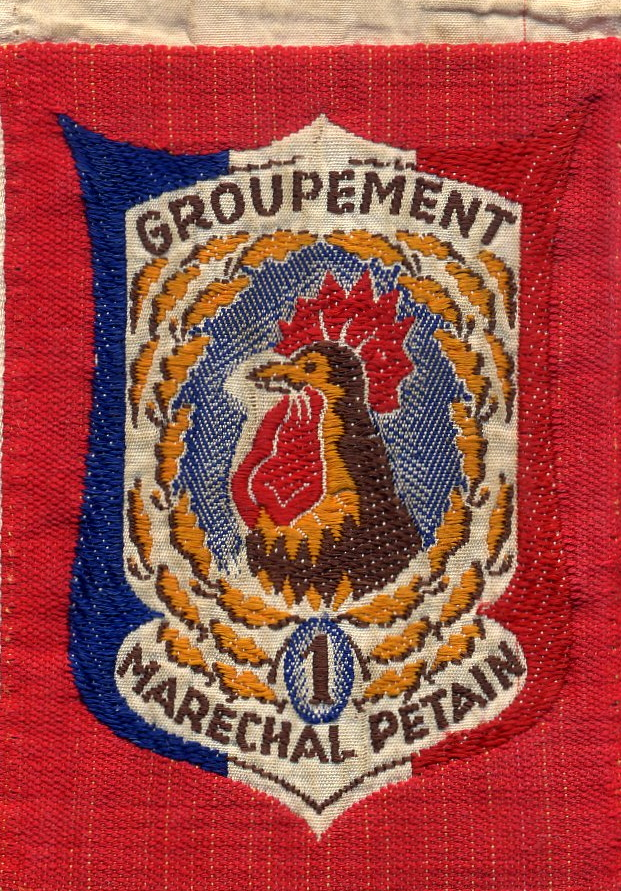
Insignia of CJF 1 - Team 2.

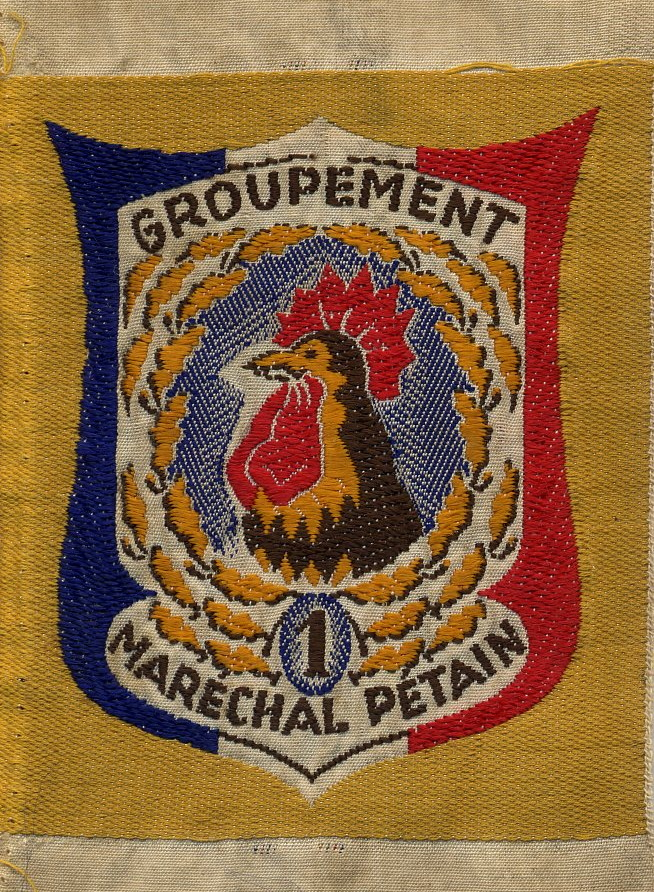
Insignia of CJF 1 - Team 3.

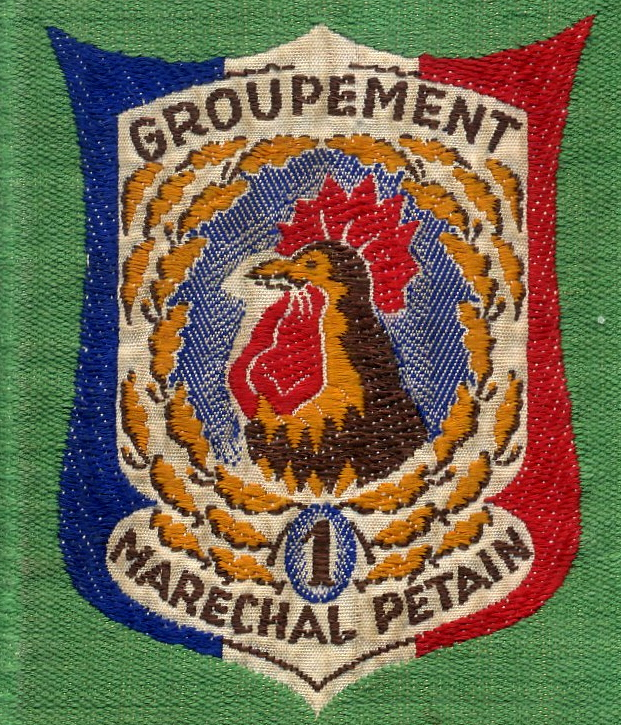
Insignia of CJF 1 - Team 4.

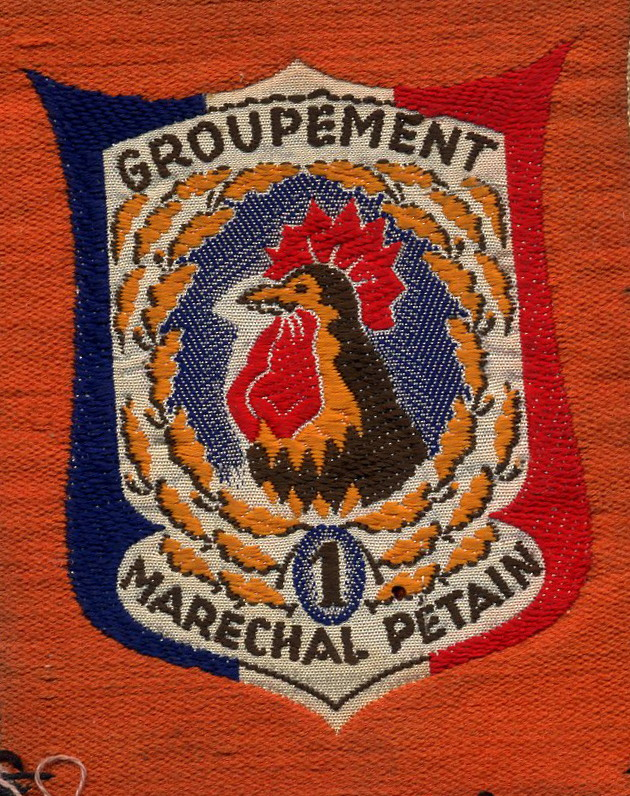
Insignia of CJF 1 - Team 5.

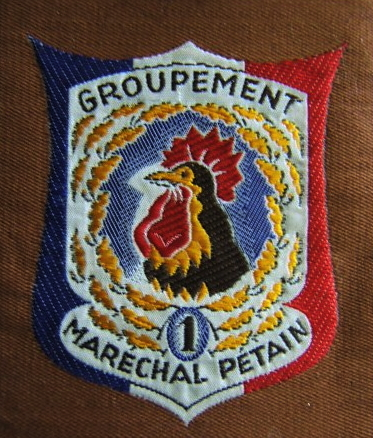
Insignia of CJF 1 - Team 6.

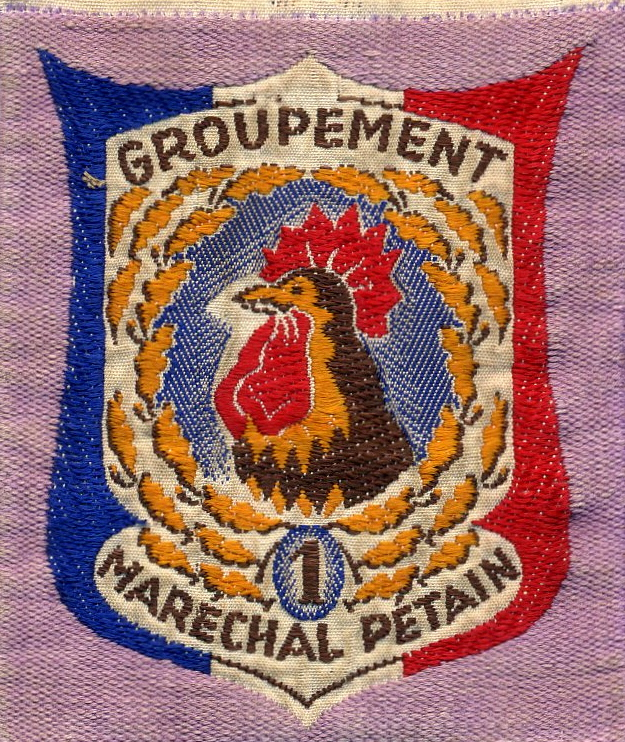
Insignia of CJF 1 - Team 7.

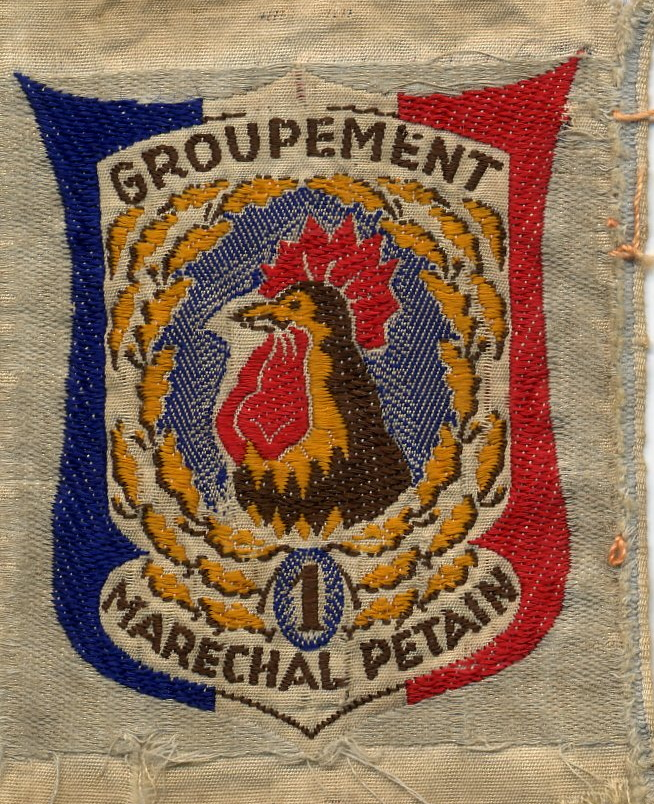
Insignia of CJF 1 - Team 8.

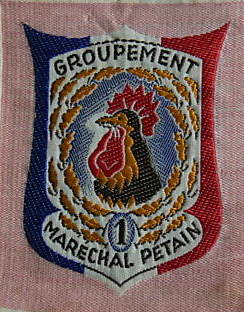
Insignia of CJF 1 - Team 10.
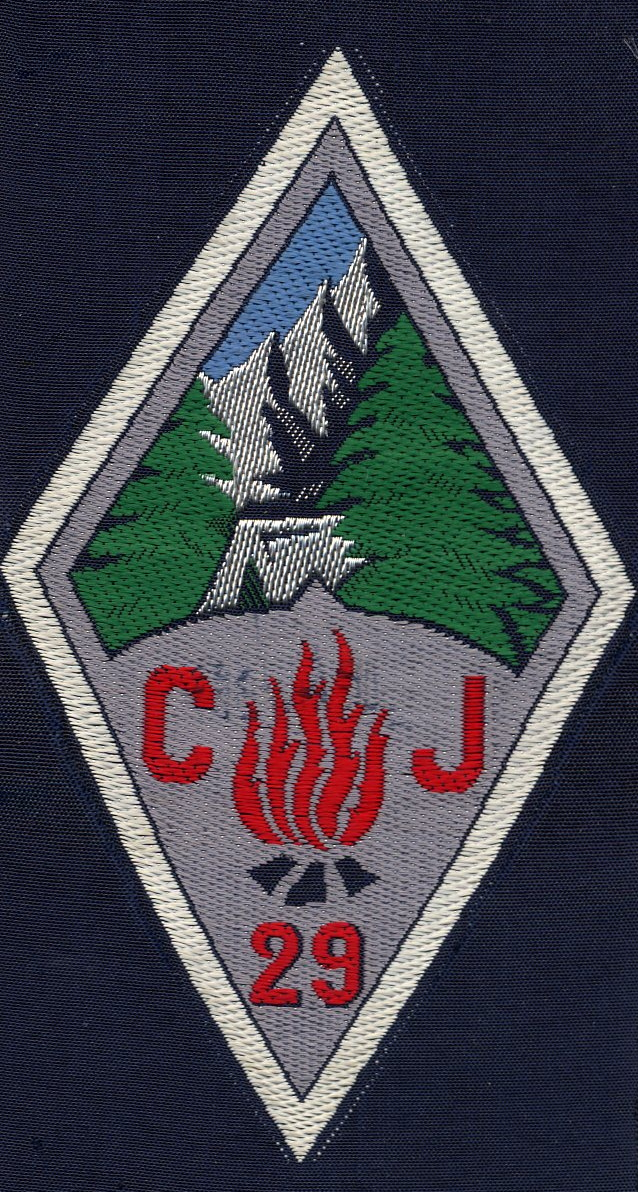
Insignia of CJF 29 - Direction Team.

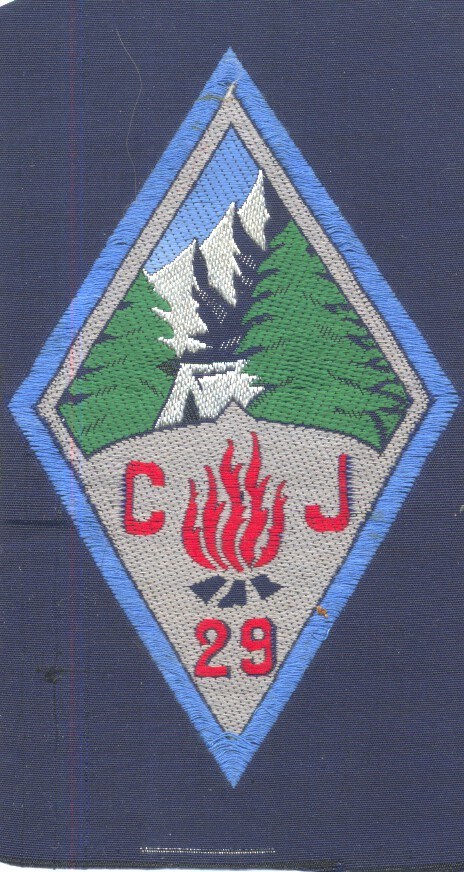
Insignia of CJF 29 - Team 1.

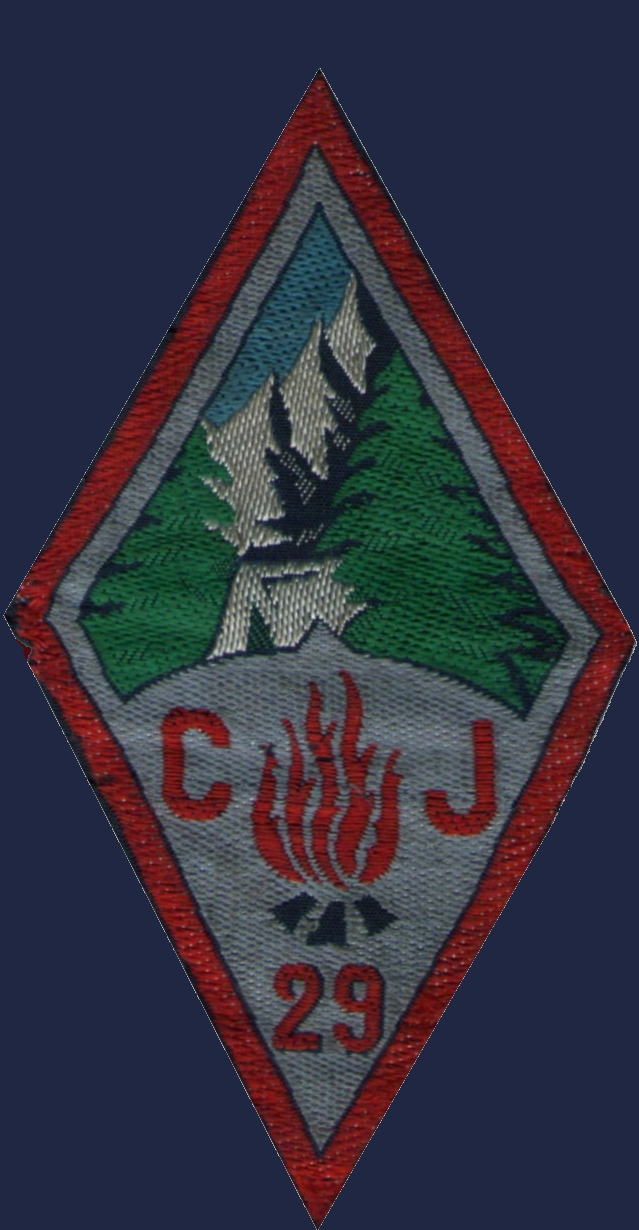
Insignia of CJF 29 - Team 2.

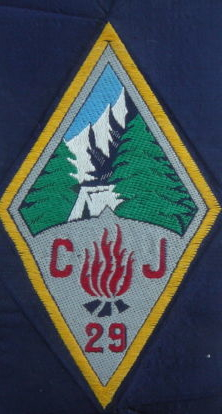
Insignia of CJF 29 - Team 3.

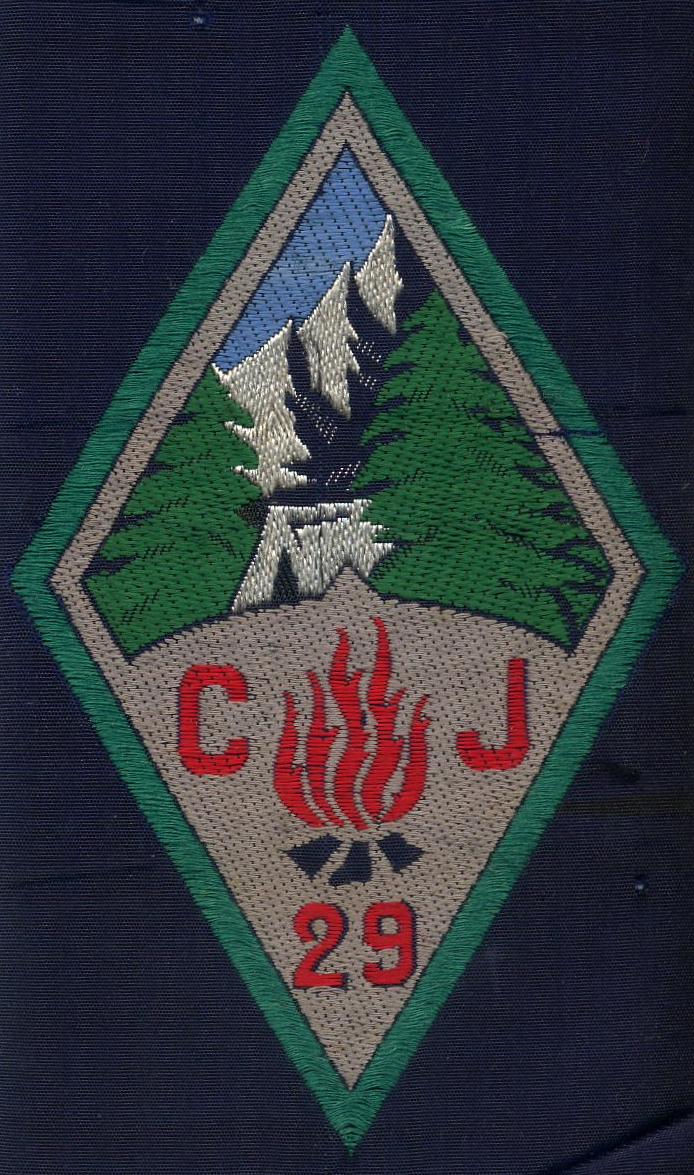
Insignia of CJF 29 - Team 4.

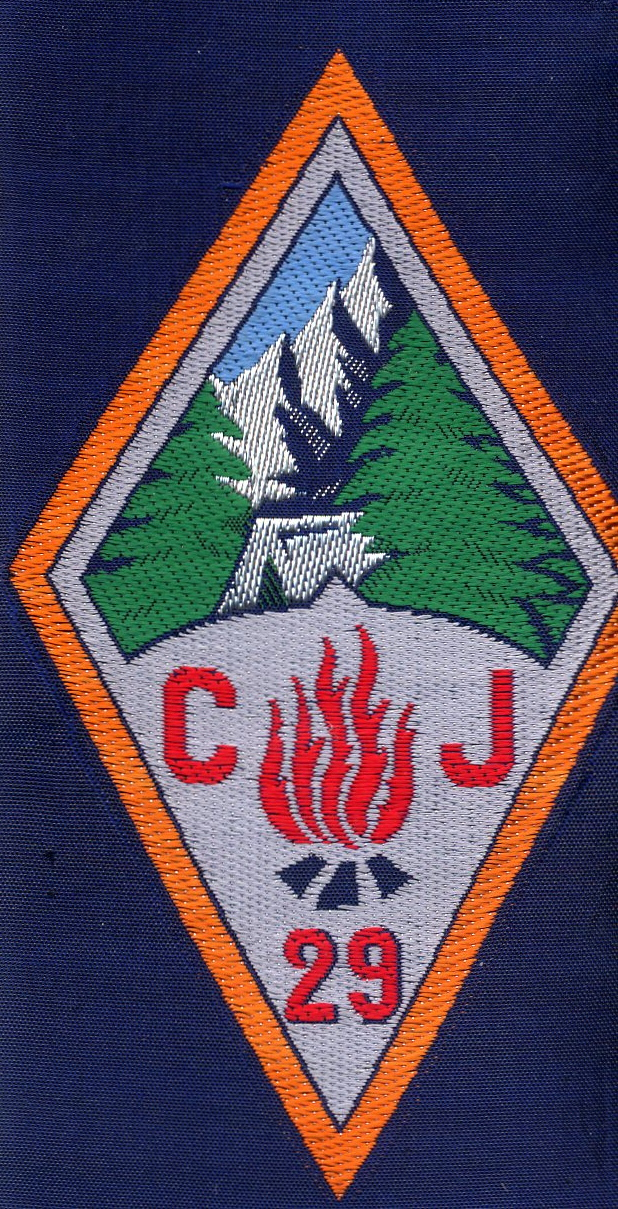
Insignia of CJF 29 - Team 5.

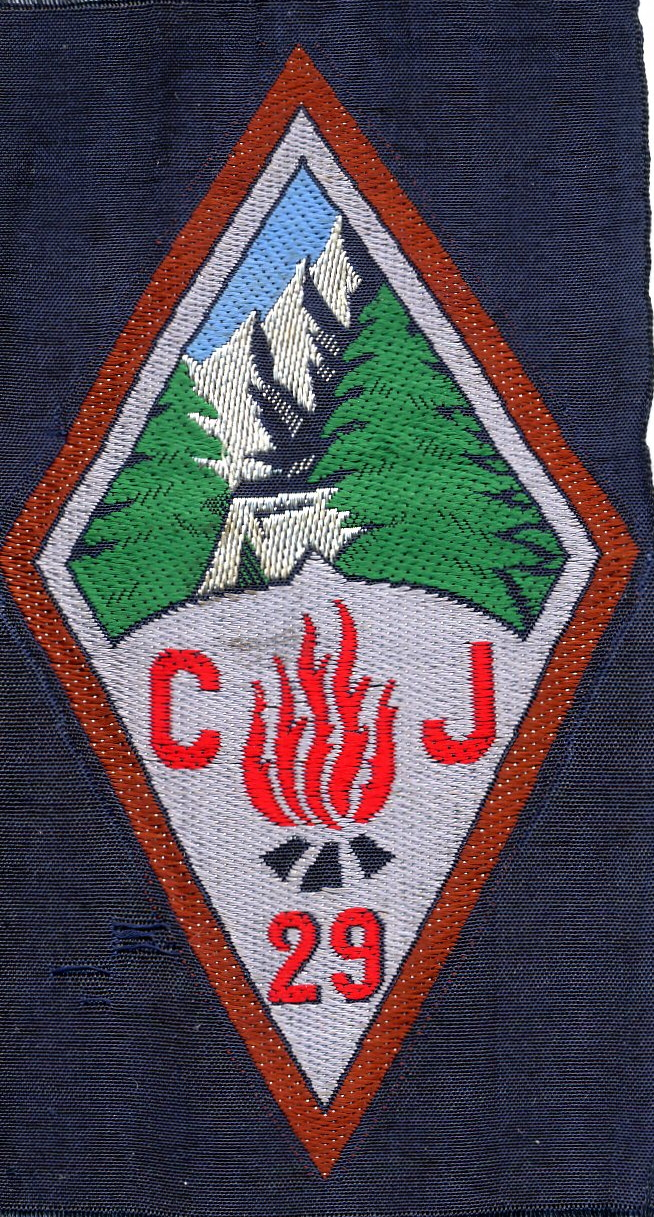
Insignia of CJF 29 - Team 6.

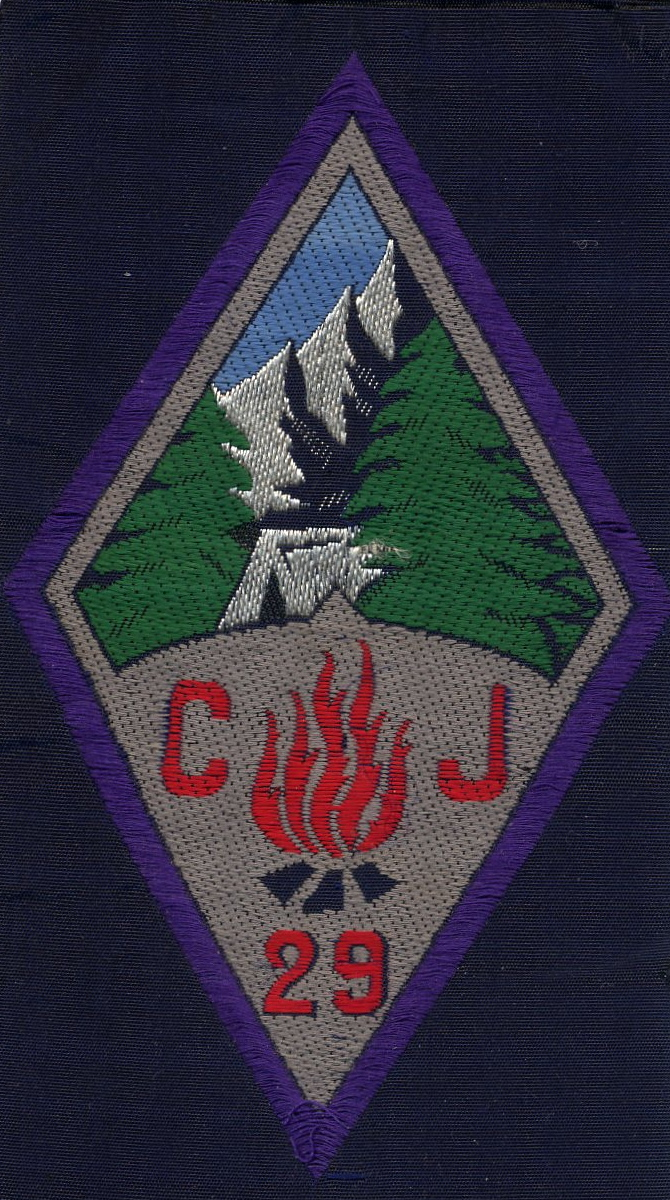
Insignia of CJF 29 - Team 7.

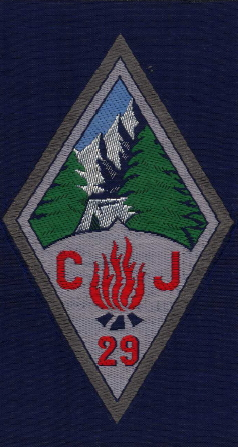
Insignia of CJF 29 - Team 8.

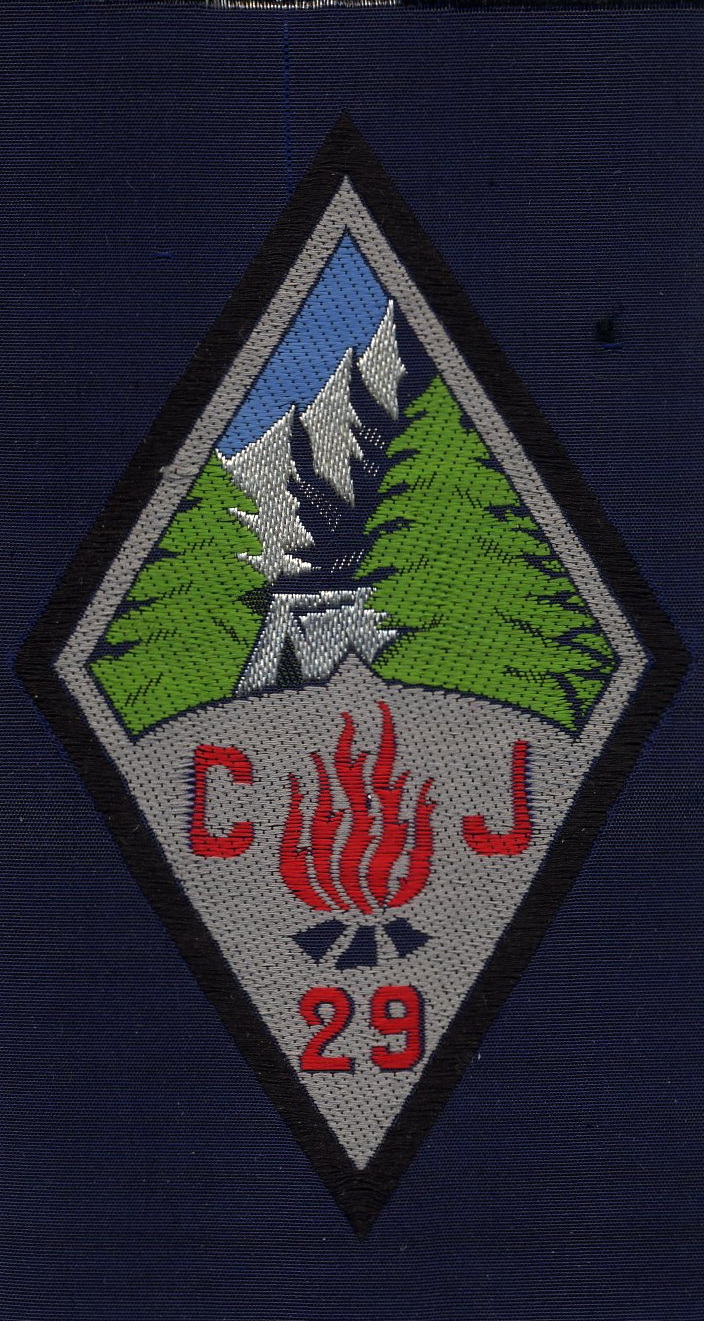
Insignia of CJF 29 - Team 9.

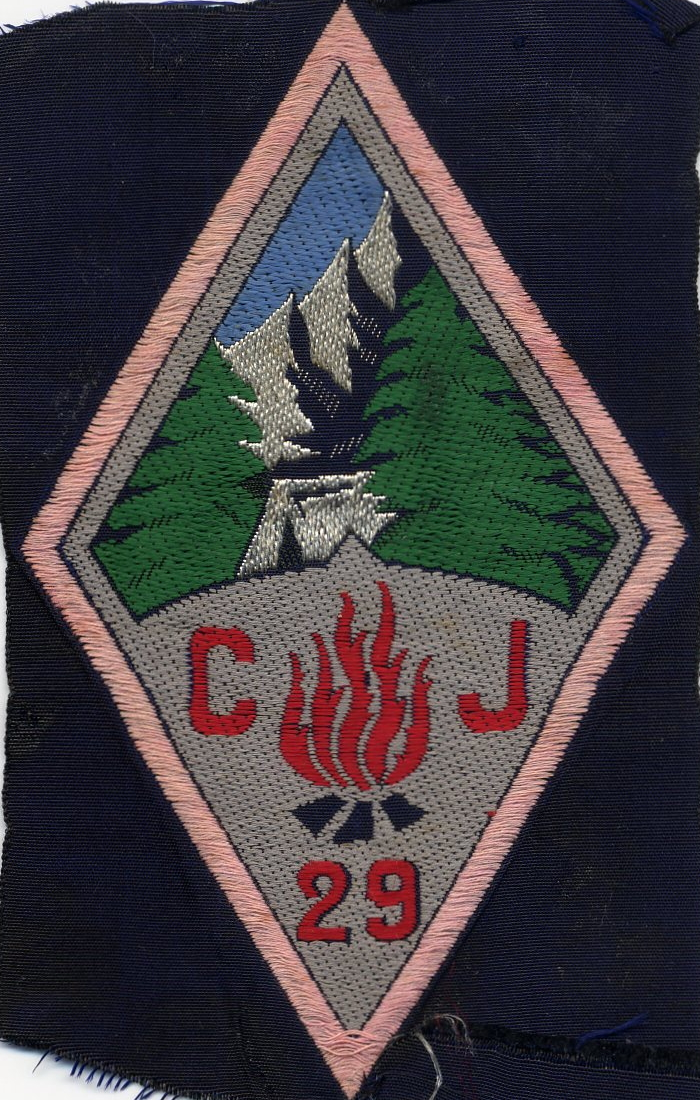
Insignia of CJF 29 - Team 10.

Rare groups had specific insignia per team. Each team of Group 24 had its own fabric insignia: Team (1/ Duguay Trouin, 2/ Surcouf, etc.).

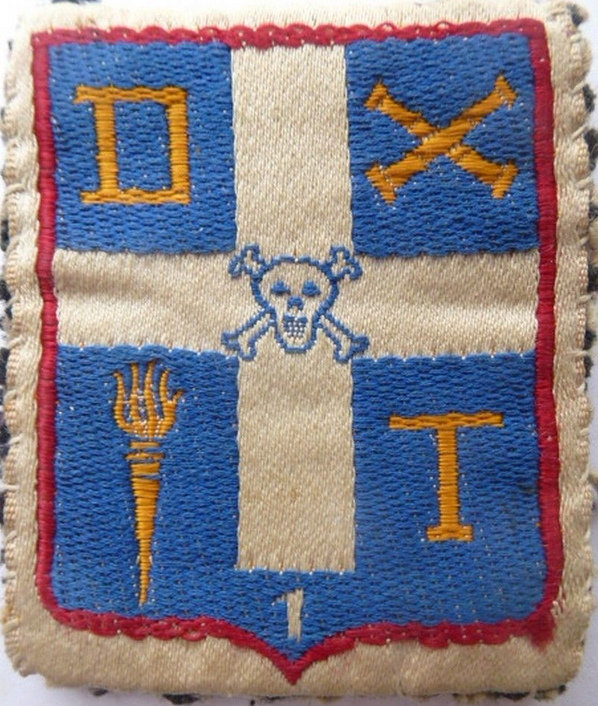
CJF 24 - Team 1.

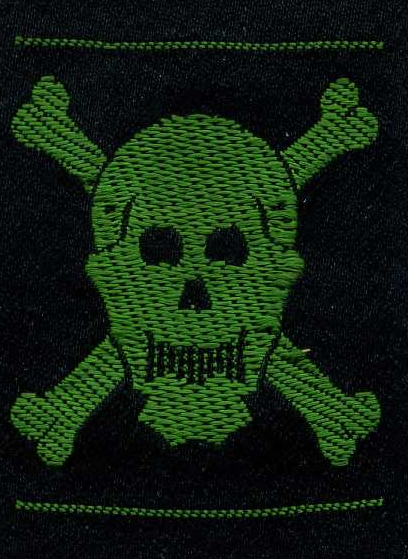
CJF 24 - Team 3.

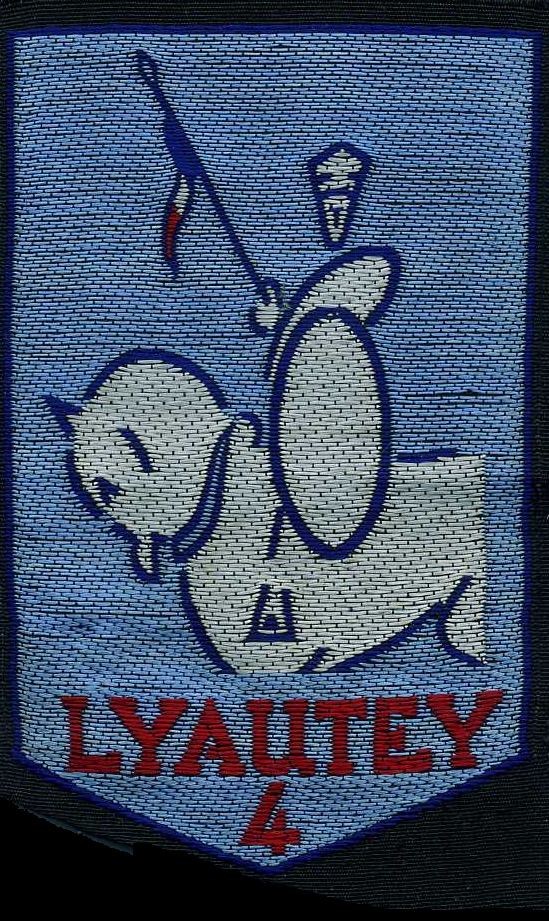
CJF 24 - Team 4.

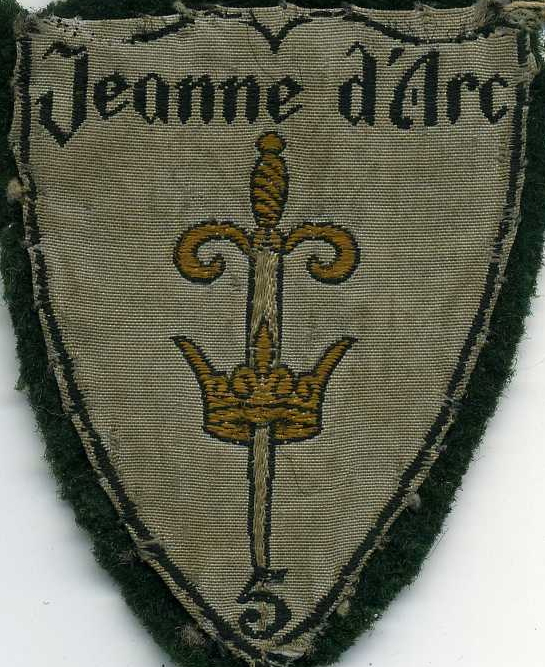
CJF 24 - Team 5.

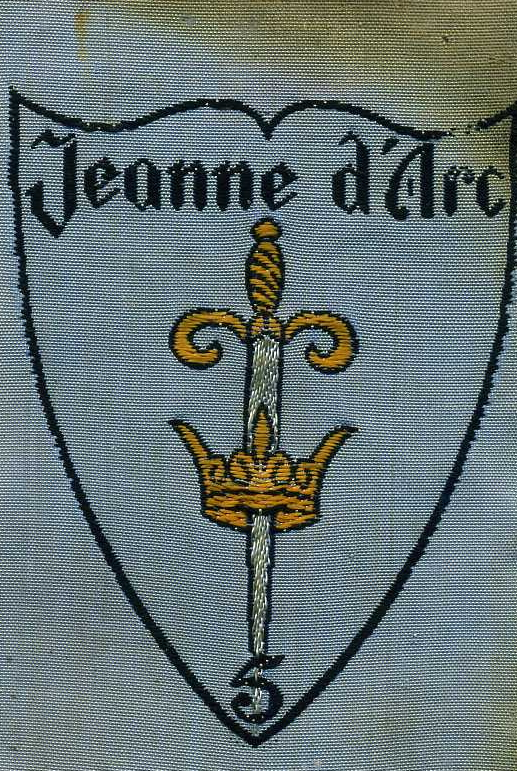
CJF 24 - Team 5.

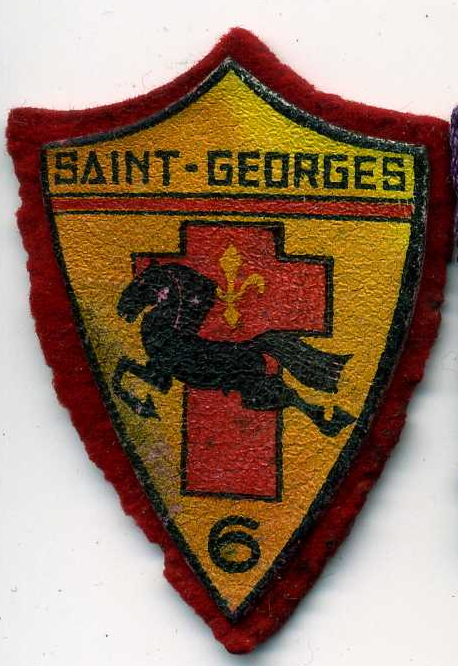
CJF 24 - Team 6.

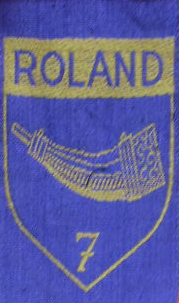
CJF 24 - Team 7.

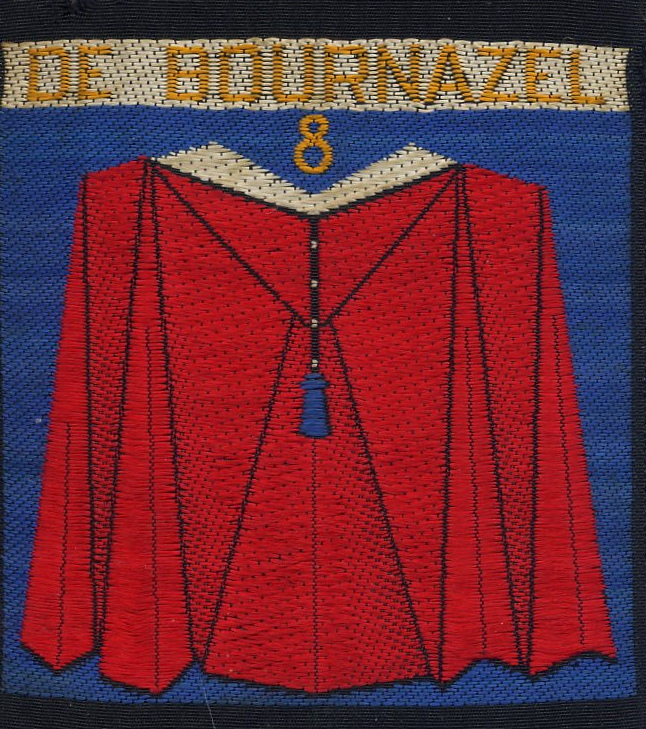
CJF 24 - Team 8.

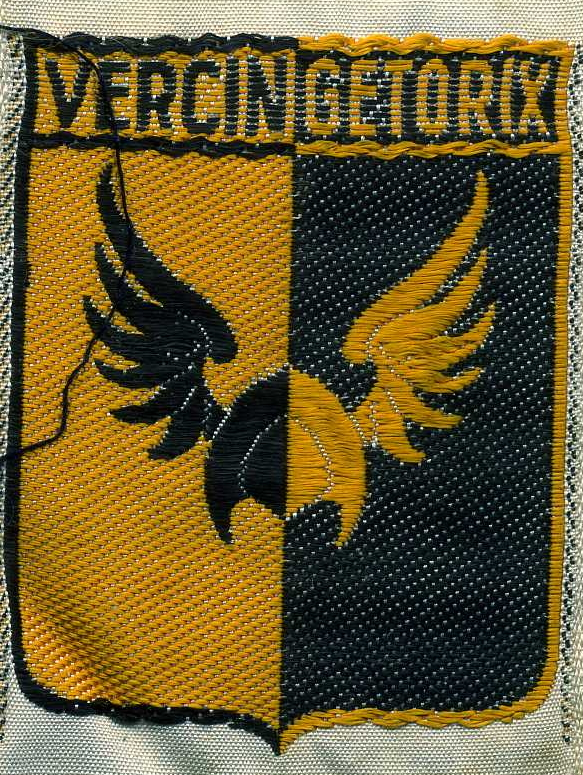
CJF 24 - Team 9.

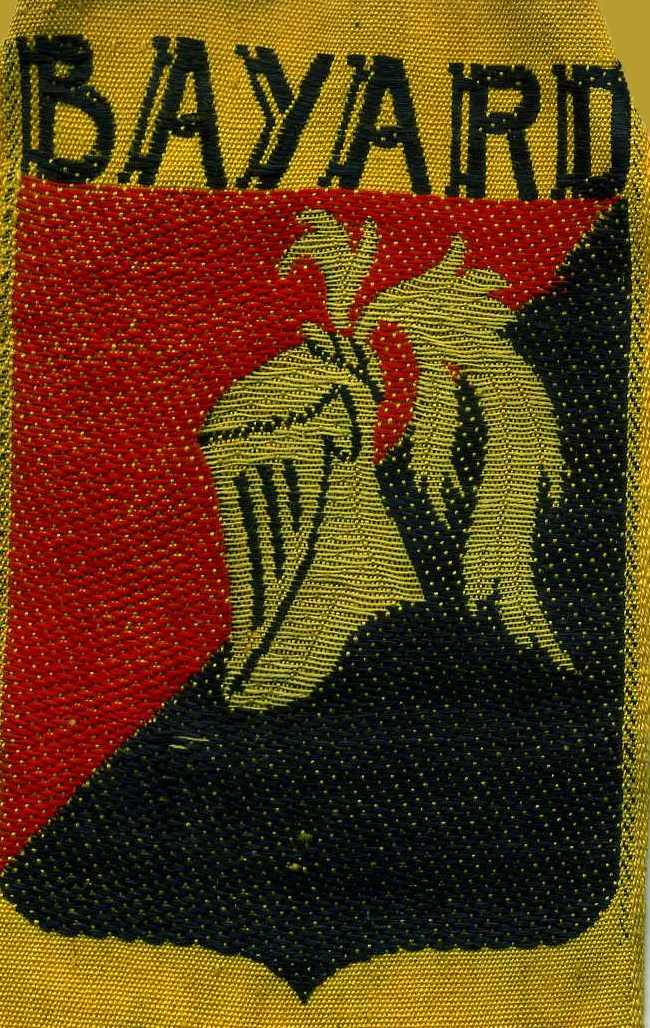
CJF 24 - Team 10.

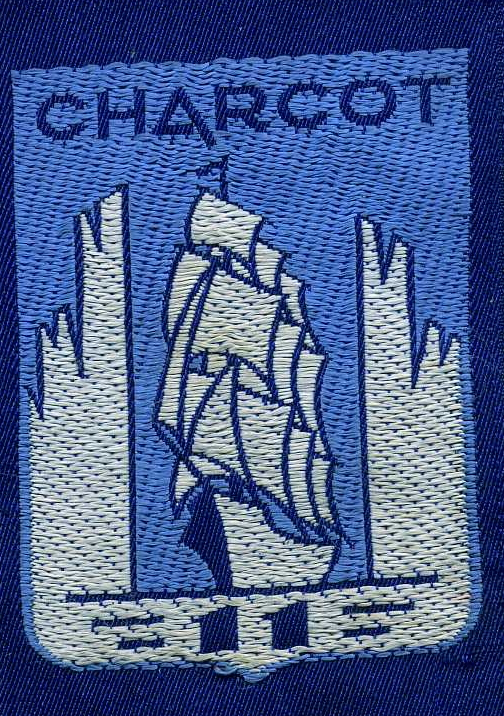
CJF 24 - Team 11.

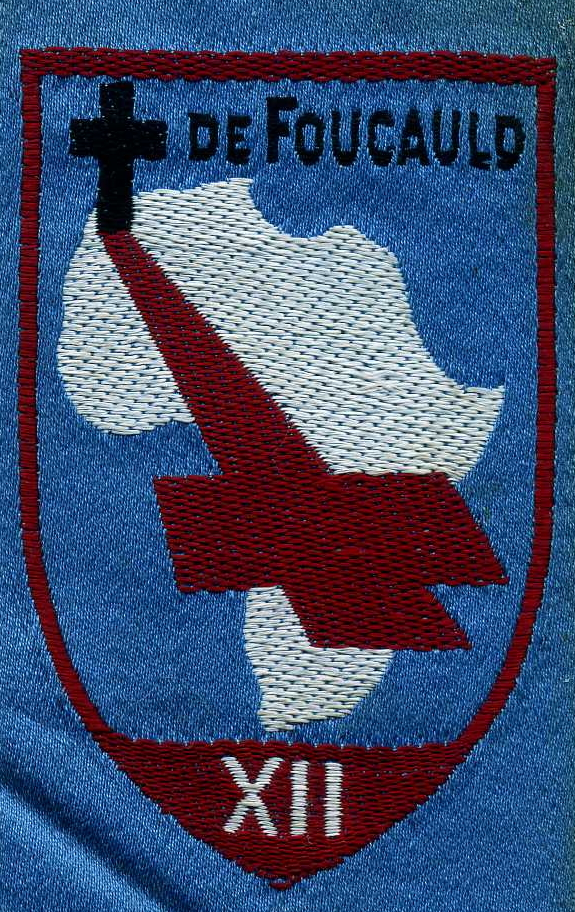
CJF 24 - Team 12.
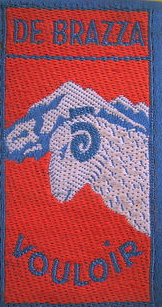
Insignia of CJF 3 - Team 5.

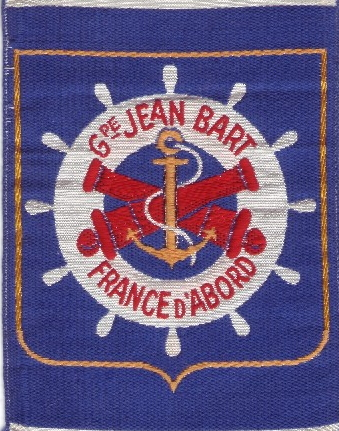
Insignia of CJF 5 - Team 10.

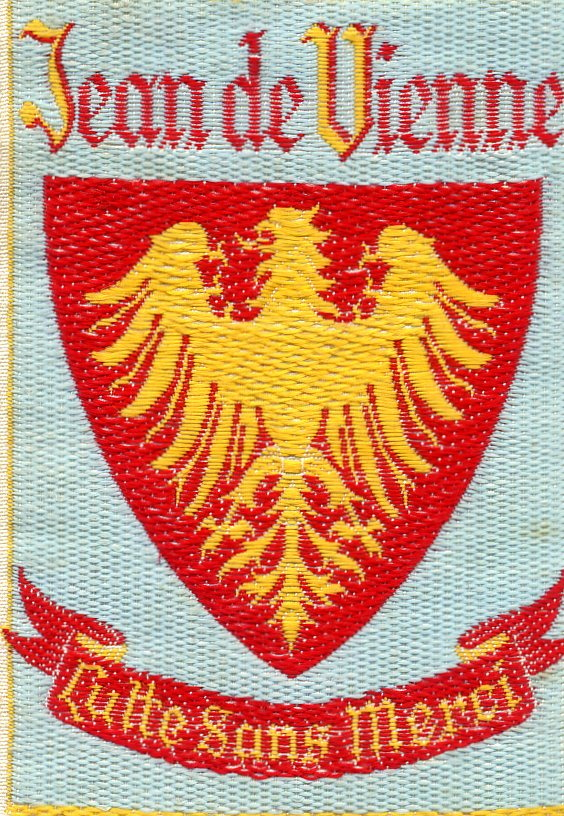
Insignia of CJF 12 - Team 6.

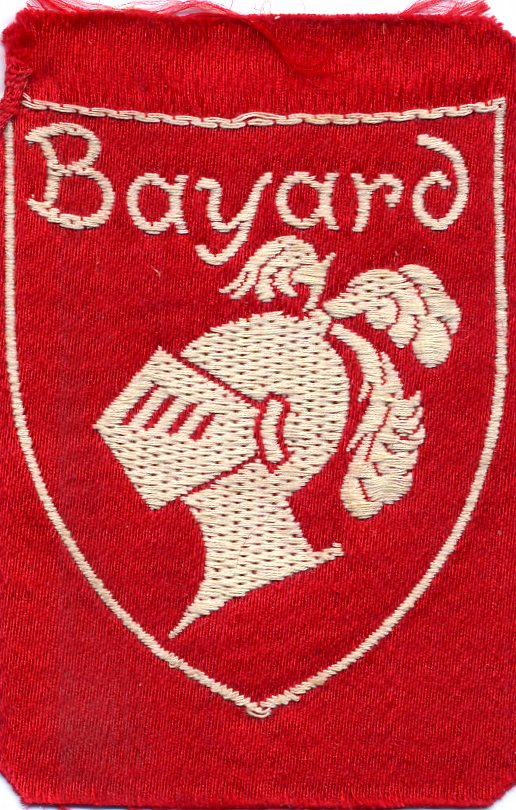
Insignia of CJF 34 - Team 2.

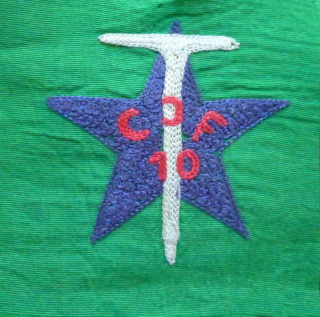
Insignia of the SES of CJF 10.

Specialty insignia The insignia is worn on the right sleeve. The physical education certificates measure 5x3 cm.

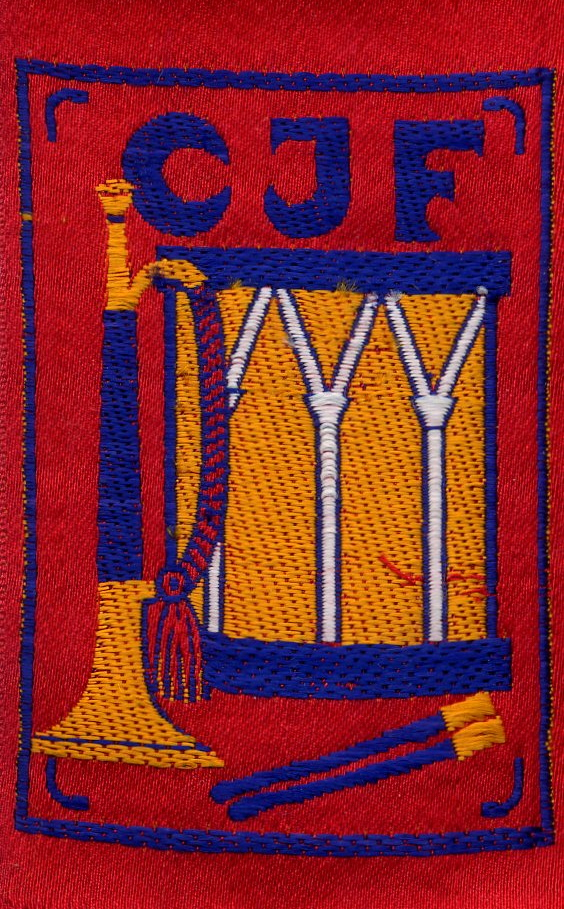
Insignia of CJF Drummers and Buglers in the groups and the national band of Châtel-Guyon.

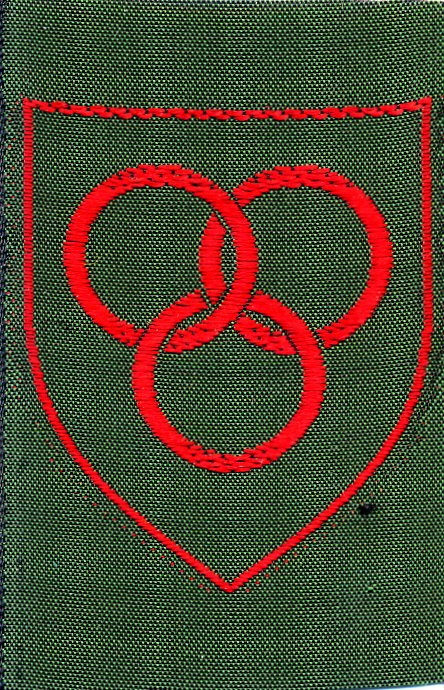
Insignia of CJF - Physical Education Certificate 1st degree.

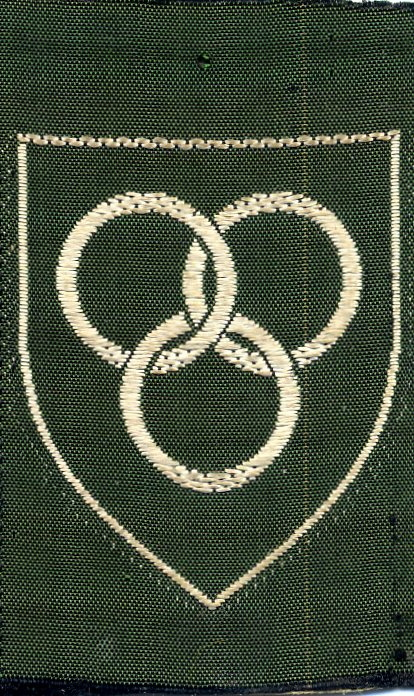
Insignia of CJF - Physical Education Certificate 2nd degree.

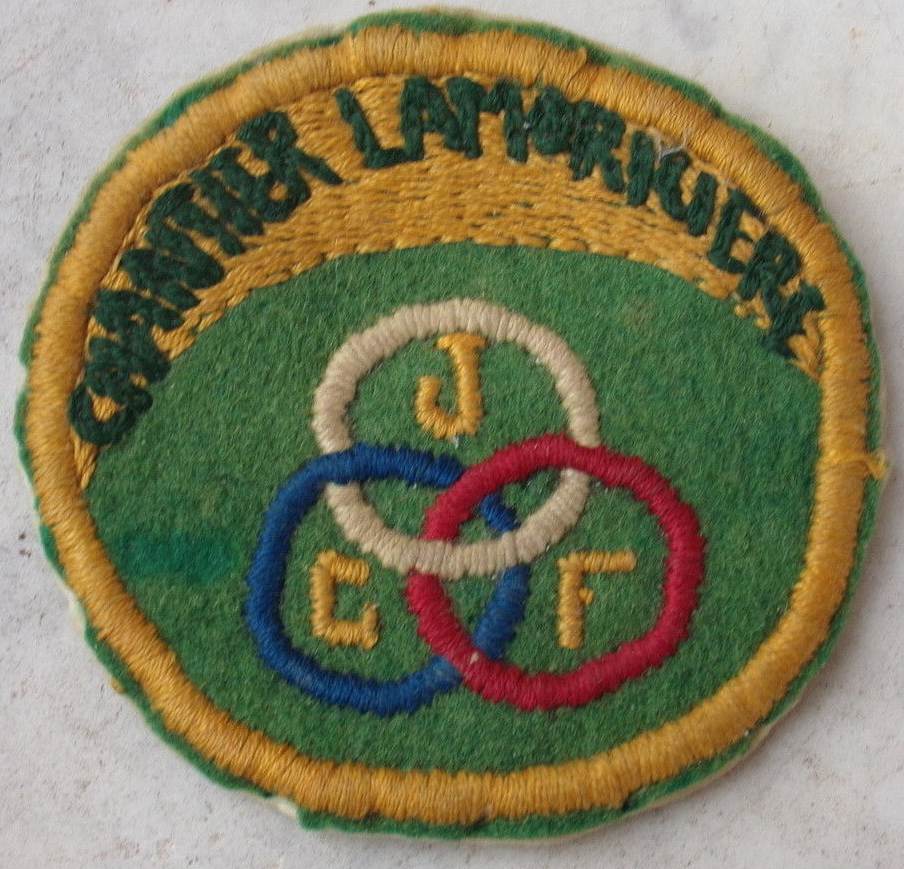
Insignia of Physical Education - CJF 105.

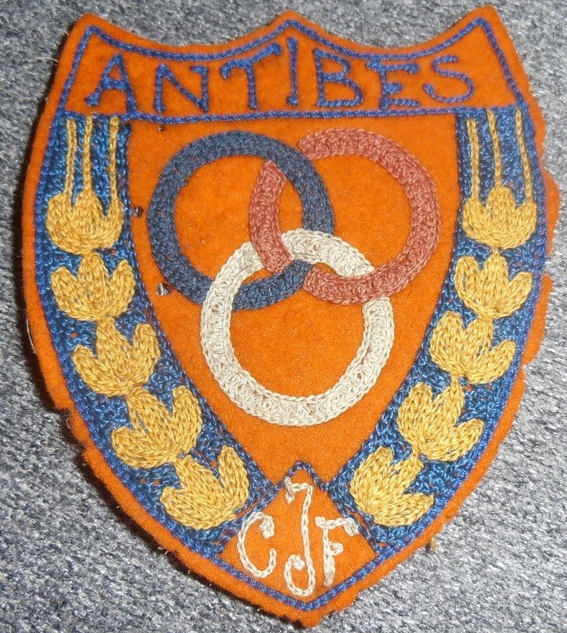
Insignia of Physical Education - CJF ANTIBES.

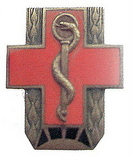
Insignia of CJF Nurses.

Insignia of Alumni

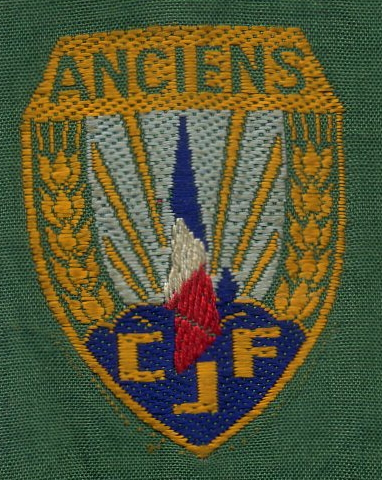
Beret insignia of Alumni.

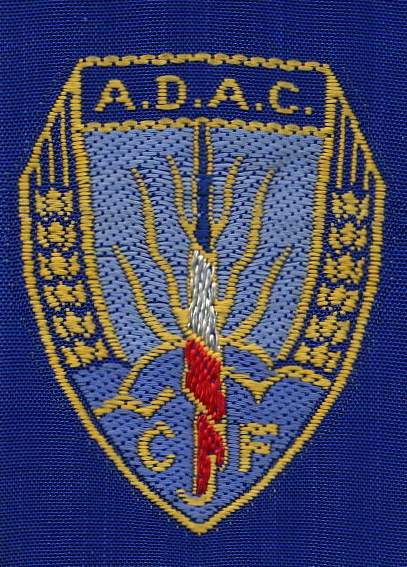
Beret insignia of ADAC.

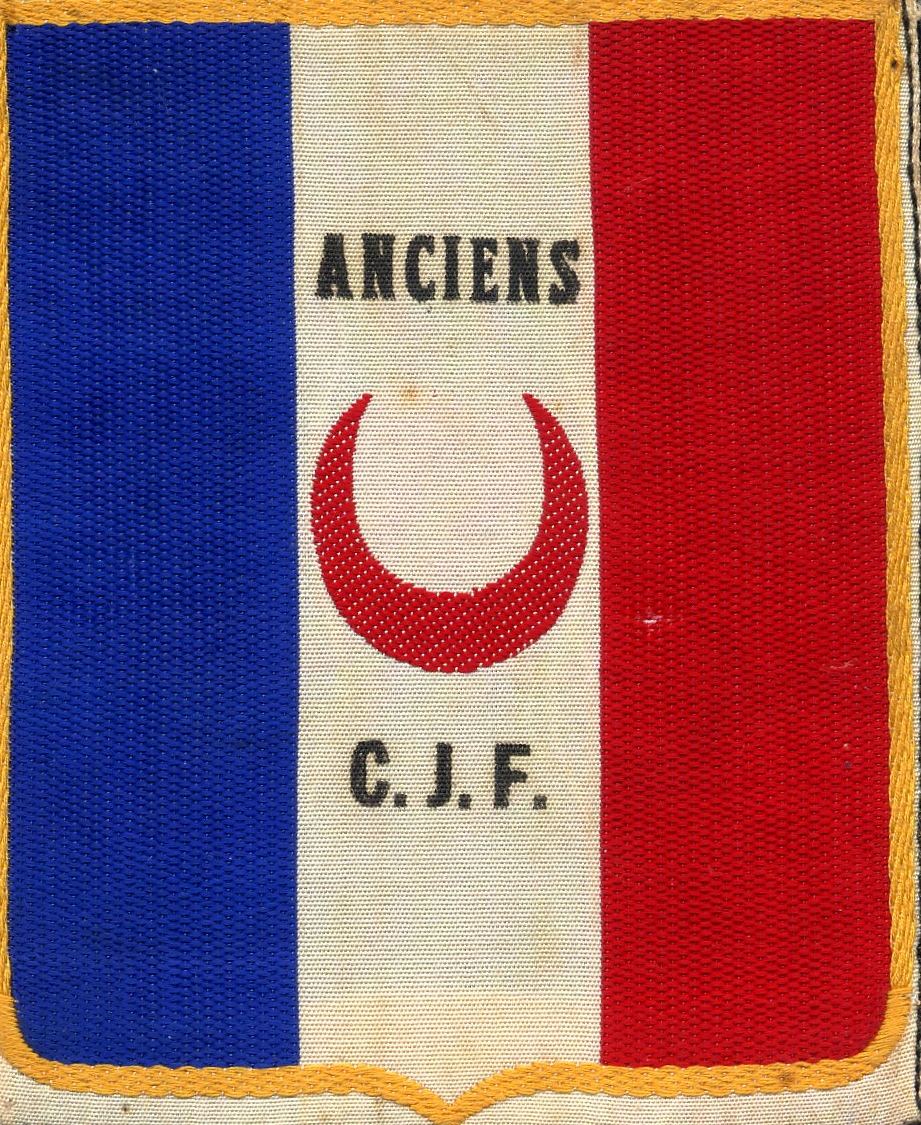
Insignia of AFN Alumni.

== Bibliography ==
- La Porte du Theil, Joseph de (1941). Un an de commandement des Chantiers de la Jeunesse [One Year of Commanding the Youth Work Camps] (in French). Paris: Sequana.
- Jean Boucron, Serge Bromberger, Gaston Courtois, Suzanne Peuteuil, Géo-Charles Veran. À 20 ans dans les Chantiers de la jeunesse [At 20 in the Youth Work Camps] (in French).
- Robert Hervet (1962). Les Chantiers de la jeunesse [The Youth Work Camps] (in French). Paris: France-Empire. p. 299.
- Jacques Évrard (1971). La déportation des travailleurs français dans le Troisième Reich [The Deportation of French Workers in the Third Reich] (in French). Paris: Fayard.
- Edmond, Paul (1985) [1982]. Images des Chantiers de la jeunesse française [Images of the French Youth Work Camps] (in French) (2nd ed.). Fontenay-sous-Bois: Éditions de l'Orme rond. p. 139. ISBN 978-2-864-03002-7.
- "Les Chantiers de la Jeunesse, 1940-1944" [The Youth Work Camps, 1940-1944]. Carnets de la Sabretache (in French) (105–E). 1990.
- Gérard Appolaro (2000). "Les Chantiers de Jeunesse (1940-1945)" [The Youth Work Camps (1940–1945)]. Club Marcophile de la Seconde Guerre Mondiale (in French) (53 and 54). Marseille.
- Pierre Giolitto (1991). Histoire de la jeunesse sous Vichy [History of Youth under Vichy] (in French). Paris: Perrin.
- Antoine Huan, ed. (1992). Histoire des Chantiers de la Jeunesse [History of the Youth Work Camps] (in French).
- Service historique de l'armée de terre (SHAT), ed. (1993). Histoire des Chantiers de la Jeunesse, racontée par des témoins [History of the Youth Work Camps, Told by Witnesses] (in French). Vincennes. p. 284. ISBN 2-904768-16-5.
- Pierre Martin (2001). La mission des Chantiers de la Jeunesse en Allemagne (1943-1945) [The Mission of the Youth Work Camps in Germany (1943–1945)] (in French). Paris: éditions de L'Harmattan. ISBN 2-7475-1255-X.
- Christophe Pécout. Une jeunesse qui travaille, une jeunesse qui chante, une jeunesse qui croît : les Chantiers de la jeunesse et la revitalisation de la jeunesse française (1940-1944) (PhD) (in French).
- Christophe Pécout (2007). Les Chantiers de la Jeunesse et la revitalisation physique et morale de la jeunesse (1940-1944) [The Youth Work Camps and the Physical and Moral Revitalization of Youth (1940–1944)] (in French). Paris: L'Harmattan.
- Laurent Battut (2007). Le groupement 22 des Chantiers de la Jeunesse, 1940-1944 [Group 22 of the Youth Work Camps, 1940–1944] (in French). ANOVI. p. 260. ISBN 978-2-914818-23-0.
- Souyris-Rolland, André, ed. (2009). Les Chantiers de la Jeunesse dans la Résistance et les combats de la Libération [The Youth Work Camps in the Resistance and the Liberation Battles] (in French). Paris: CERPA.
- Olivier Faron (2011). Les chantiers de jeunesse : avoir vingt ans sous Pétain [The Youth Work Camps: Being Twenty under Pétain] (in French). Paris: Grasset. ISBN 978-2-246-75971-3.
- Gabriel Carnévalé; Bertrand Sinais (1983). Histoire postale des Chantiers de la Jeunesse (1940-1945) [Postal History of the Youth Work Camps (1940–1945)] (in French). Marseille: Philoffset Éditions.
- Francis A. Boddart (2014). Les chantiers de la jeunesse et la Dordogne, 1940-1944 : de la révolution nationale à la production industrielle [The Youth Work Camps and Dordogne, 1940–1944: From the National Revolution to Industrial Production] (in French). Périgueux: IFIE, Éditions Périgord. ISBN 978-2-91626518-6.
- Battut, Laurent (2010). "L'insigne général des Chantiers de jeunesse" [The General Insignia of the Youth Work Camps]. "Quand Même", Bulletin de liaison de l'Association Mémoire des Chantiers de la Jeunesse Française (in French). 34 rue Charles Gide 34670 Baillargues: éditions AMCJF: 9–12.
- Battut, Laurent (2010). "Les Chantiers de jeunesse, L'exemple du camp 40 : le camp de redressement des Chantiers" [The Youth Work Camps, The Example of Camp 40: The Disciplinary Camp of the Work Camps]. Histoire(s) de la dernière guerre (in French) (8). Aix-en-Provence: éditions Caraktères: 10–17.
- Battut, Laurent (2010). "Les Chantiers de jeunesse en région Ain-Dauphiné-Savoie" [The Youth Work Camps in the Ain-Dauphiné-Savoie Region]. Les Militaires dans la Résistance Ain-Dauphiné-Savoie (in French). éditions Anovi 37720 Avon-Les-Roches: 83–106.
- Battut, Laurent (2009). "Les Chantiers de Jeunesse en Combraille (1940-1944); Le groupement 5 de Rochefort-Montagne puis Pontgibaud; Le groupement 22 de Messeix; Le groupement 26 de Felletin" [The Youth Work Camps in Combraille (1940–1944); Group 5 of Rochefort-Montagne then Pontgibaud; Group 22 of Messeix; Group 26 of Felletin]. FINES (in French). III. Giat: Association Archéologique FINES: 69–91.
- Battut, Laurent; Lebacq, Baptiste (2009). "Le groupement 101 des Chantiers de Jeunesse au Maroc" [Group 101 of the Youth Work Camps in Morocco]. Militaria Magazine (in French) (286). Paris: Histoire et Collections: 72–77.
- Hervet, Robert (1969). "Les Chantiers de la Jeunesse" [The Youth Work Camps]. Historia (in French) (64).
- Hervet, Robert (1972). "Les Chantiers de la Jeunesse" [The Youth Work Camps]. Miroir de l'Histoire (in French) (268).
- Josse, Raymond (1964). "Les Chantiers de la Jeunesse" [The Youth Work Camps]. Revue d'histoire de la Deuxième Guerre mondiale (in French) (56).
- Lee, Daniel (2015). "The Chantiers de la Jeunesse, General de la Porte du Theil, and the Myth of the Rescue of Jews in Vichy France". French Historical Studies. 38 (1): 139–170. doi:10.1215/00161071-2822733.
- Lascaud, Maïté; Dutheil, Frédéric (2002). "Pratiques physiques et sportives, formation virile et morale dans les Chantiers de la jeunesse, 1940-1944" [Physical and Sporting Practices, Virile and Moral Training in the Youth Work Camps, 1940–1944]. STAPS, Revue Internationale des sciences du sport et de l'éducation physique (in French). 23 (58): 35–48. doi:10.3917/sta.058.0035.
- Lascaud, Maïté; Dutheil, Frédéric (2002). "Pratiques physiques et sportives, formation virile et morale dans les Chantiers de la jeunesse, 1940-1944". In Arnaud, Pierre; Terret, Thierry; Saint-Martin, Jean-Philippe; Gros, Pierre (eds.). Le sport et les français sous l'occupation. 1940-1944 [Physical and Sporting Practices, Virile and Moral Training in the Youth Work Camps, 1940–1944] (in French). Vol. 2. Paris: L’Harmattan. pp. 97–111.
- Mainier-Schall, Fabrice (2005). "Uniformes et équipements des Chantiers de la Jeunesse française (1940-1944)" [Uniforms and Equipment of the French Youth Work Camps (1940–1944)]. Batailles (in French) (5).
- Pécout, Christophe (2005). "L'éducation physique dans les chantiers de la jeunesse (1940-1944): exemple de trois initiatives originales" [Physical Education in the Youth Work Camps (1940–1944): Example of Three Original Initiatives]. Guerres Mondiales et Conflits Contemporains (in French). 218 (218). Paris: Presses universitaires de France: 15–25. doi:10.3917/gmcc.218.0015.
- Pécout, Christophe (2007). "Une entreprise de formation morale et physique de la jeunesse française, les Chantiers de la Jeunesse (1940-1944)" [An Enterprise of Moral and Physical Training of French Youth, the Youth Work Camps (1940–1944)]. Les Cahiers de psychologie politique (in French) (10).
- Pécout, Christophe (2008). "Les Jeunes et la politique de Vichy, le cas des Chantiers de Jeunesse" [Youth and Vichy Policy, the Case of the Youth Work Camps]. Histoire et Politique, politique, culture, société (in French). 4 (4): 9. doi:10.3917/hp.004.0009.
- Pécout, Christophe (2008). "Les Pratiques physiques et sportives au service de l'idéal vichyste, l'exemple des Chantiers de Jeunesse" [Physical and Sporting Practices in the Service of the Vichy Ideal, the Example of the Youth Work Camps]. Sciences Sociales et Sports (in French) (1). doi:10.3917/rsss.001.0005.
- Pécout, Christophe (2008). "Les Chantiers de la Jeunesse, une expérience de service civil obligatoire" [The Youth Work Camps, an Experiment in Compulsory Civil Service]. Agora débats/Jeunesse (in French) (47). doi:10.3917/agora.047.0024.
- Pécout, Christophe (2009). "Les chantiers de la jeunesse (1940-1944): une expérimentation pédagogique sous le gouvernement de Vichy" [The Youth Work Camps (1940–1944): A Pedagogical Experiment under the Vichy Government]. Guerres Mondiales et Conflits Contemporains (in French). 234 (234). Paris: Presses universitaires de France: 53–62. doi:10.3917/gmcc.234.0053.
- Pousse, Christian (2009). "Le Groupement 27 des Chantiers de Jeunesse" [Group 27 of the Youth Work Camps]. Sparsae (in French) (64). Association culturelle d'Aigueperse.
