= Napoleon (disambiguation) =

Napoleon (1769–1821) was a French military leader and emperor.

Napoleon, Napoléon, Napoleón, Napoleone, or Napoleonic may also refer to:

- Napoleon (given name), a given name, including list of people and characters with the name
- Napoleone, an Italian masculine given name

== Fictional characters ==
- Napoleon (Animal Farm), a pig who serves as the main antagonist of George Orwell's Animal Farm
- Napoleon, a bloodhound in The Aristocats
- Napoleon, a character in My Uncle Napoleon
- Napoleon, a nickname given to Captain Mainwaring by Chief ARP Warden Hodges in Dad's Army
- Napoleon Dynamite, the titular main protagonist of the film Napoleon Dynamite

== Film, stage, and television ==
- Napoléon (1927 film), a French silent film by Abel Gance
- Napoleon (1951 film), an Italian film by Carlo Borghesio
- Napoléon (1955 film), a French historical epic by Sacha Guitry
- Napoleon (1995 film), an Australian film by Mario Andreacchio
- Napoleon (Heroes and Villains episode), an episode of 2007 British drama-documentary series, Heroes and Villains.
- Napoleon (2023 film), a film by Ridley Scott
- Napoleon (1991 TV series), a French-Polish historical miniseries
- Napoléon (miniseries), a 2002 historical miniseries
- Napoleon (musical)
- Napoleon, an unrealized project of Stanley Kubrick

== Games ==
=== Board games ===
- Napoleon (board game), a 1974 board game about the Waterloo campaign
- Napoleon Gambit, a variation of the Scotch Game chess opening
- Napoleon Opening, a chess opening

=== Card games ===
- Napoleon (card game), a trick-taking card game
- Napoleon at St Helena, a two-deck patience or solitaire
- Napoleon, a single-deck patience or solitaire more commonly known as Freecell
- Napoleon's Square, a patience or solitaire

=== Video or PC games ===
- Napoleon (video game), a 2001 Game Boy Advance game
- Napoleon: Total War, a strategy game for the PC
- Napoleon, a real-time strategy game for Windows
- Napoleon, a video game published by Enix

== Music ==
- Napoleon (band), a British metalcore band
- "Napoleon" (Peter Wolfe song), 2004
- "Napoleon" (Suicideboys song), 2025
- "Napoleon", a song by Ani DiFranco from Dilate
- Napoleon XIV, stage name of singer Jerry Samuels
- José María Napoleón, Mexican singer and composer

== People ==
- Napoleon II (1811–1832), son of Napoleon I
- Napoleon III (1808–1873), last monarch and first president of France, son of Napoleon I's brother Louis
- Napoléon, Prince Imperial (1856–1879), the only child of Emperor Napoleon III
- Prince Napoléon-Jérôme Bonaparte (1822-1891), son of Napoleon I's brother Jérôme
- Napoléon, comte Daru (1807–1890), French soldier and politician, godson of Napoléon
- Napoleon Cybulski (1854–1919), Polish physiologist, discoverer of adrenaline
- Napoleon A. L'Herault (1882-1932), American lawyer and politician
- Napoleon (actor) (born 1963), Tamil film actor
- Napoleon (rapper) (born 1977), American rapper
- Napoleon Bonaparte (police officer) (1965–2026), Indonesian police officer
- Napoléon Lajoie (1874–1959), American baseball player
- Napoleon Lemay (1865–1946), Canadian politician from Quebec

== Places ==
=== Australia ===
- Napoleons, Victoria

=== Poland ===
- Napoleon, Silesian Voivodeship

=== United States ===
- Napoleon, Arkansas
- Napoleon, Indiana
- Napoleon, Kentucky
- Napoleon, Michigan
- Napoleon, Mississippi
- Napoleon, Missouri
- Napoleon, North Dakota
- Napoleon, Ohio
- Napoleon Township (disambiguation)

== Ships ==
- Napoléon-class ship of the line, a class of ship of the French Navy
- French ship Napoléon, a French Navy ship name
- French battleship Napoléon, a French ship of the line commissioned in 1850
- MV Napoleon, a British ship
- Corse (ship) or Napoléon, a French schooner ship

== Other uses ==
- Napoléon (coin)
- Napoleon (gun), a cannon
- Napoleon, a grade of cognac
- Napoleon (pastry) or Mille-feuille, a French pastry
- Napoleonka or kremówka, a Polish variation of the French pastry
- Napoleon sweets, small Belgian sweet
- Humphead wrasse or Napoleon fish
- Napoleone, a comics series published by Sergio Bonelli Editore
- Napoleonic collar, a kind of turnover collar
- Napoleon (company), a manufacturer of fireplaces and grills
- Napoleonic (Fabergé egg)

== See also ==
- Age of Napoleon (board game), a 2003 board game about the Napoleonic Wars in Europe
- Napoleon and Uncle Elby, a syndicated comic strip
- Napoleon complex, a psychological condition affecting short people
- Napoleonite, a variety of igneous rock
- Napoleon Bonaparte (disambiguation)
- Prince Napoléon (disambiguation)
