= Bonaparte =

Bonaparte is a French and Italian surname. It derives from Italian bona (buona) 'good' and parte 'solution' or 'match' (a name bestowed as an expression of satisfaction at a newborn's arrival).

Bonaparte may refer to:

== People ==
- The House of Bonaparte (est. 1804), an imperial and royal European dynasty
  - Napoleon I (1769–1821), First Empire emperor of France, founder of the noble house
  - Joseph Bonaparte, King of Naples and Spain
  - Napoleon III, Second Empire emperor of France
- José Bonaparte (1928–2020), Argentine paleontologist
- Charles Bonaparte (disambiguation), the name of several people
- Napoleon Bonaparte (disambiguation), the name of several people

== Places ==
=== Antarctica ===
- Bonaparte Point, next to Arthur Harbour
- Mount Bonaparte (Antarctica)

=== Australia ===
- Bonaparte Basin, sedimentary basin across the boundary of Western Australia and the Northern Territory
- Bonaparte Coast, another name for the Northwest Shelf Transition region of Australia's continental shelf
- Bonaparte Gulf on the coast in the same area

=== Canada ===
- Bonaparte River, a river in British Columbia
- Bonaparte Lake, a lake in British Columbia
  - Bonaparte Provincial Park, a park in the area of the lake
- Bonaparte Plateau, a plateau in British Columbia

=== France ===
- Île Bonaparte, name from 1806 to 1810 of the island now called Réunion

=== United States ===
- Bonaparte, Iowa, a city
- Bonaparte Township, Van Buren County, Iowa
- Lake Bonaparte (New York), Lewis County, New York
- Mount Bonaparte, Washington
- Bonaparte Lake, Washington

== Other ==
- Bonaparte (band), a Berlin-based indie punk band
  - Bonaparte (album), 2014
- Bonaparte, the mini-tank from the Masamune Shirow's Dominion
- Bonaparte First Nation, a band government in British Columbia, Canada
  - Bonaparte Indian Reserve No. 3, an Indian Reserve of the Bonaparte First Nation

== See also ==
- Napoleon (disambiguation)
