= Esterellite =

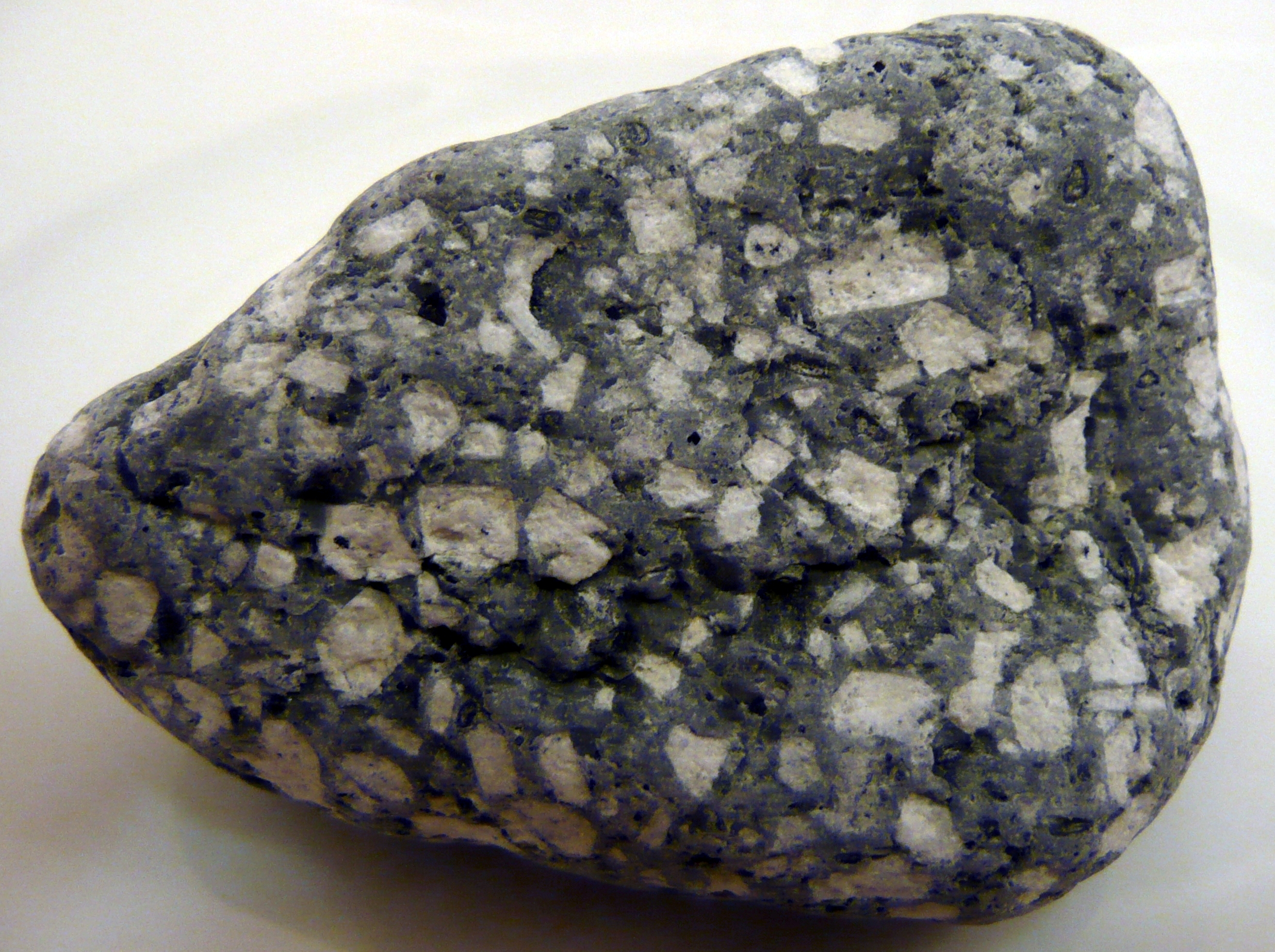
Small block of Esterellite taken on a beach between Saint-Raphaël and Le Dramont

Esterellite (or Estérellite) is a porphyritic variety of quartz-bearing microdiorite, containing phenocrysts of quartz, zoned andesine, and hornblende only found in the southern part of the Esterel massif, between Agay and Saint-Raphael, France. It is a bluish-grey rock, sometimes greenish, dotted with white plagioclase feldspar and amphibiole crystals, forming a thick laccolithic complex near Le Drammont.

This volcanic rock, also known as the blue porphyry of Estérel, was named by the French geologist Auguste Michel-Levy in 1896. The Romans used it as paving materials but also for decorative purposes. Today, it is mainly used to make riprap, such as blocks for the dikes of the ports of Saint-Raphaël and Fréjus, railway ballast and road gravel.

== Structure and composition ==
Esterellite is a porphyritic rock, completely crystalline, containing large phenocrysts (plagioclases, quartz, ferromagnesians), which are very visible to the naked eye, and a matrix of very small microcrystals. The overall composition of this rock places it among the slightly alkaline andesites and dacites of the subalkaline igneous magma series, typical of subduction zones.

The most visible crystals are numerous andesine-type plagioclases, often zoned (because they are more calcic in the centre), but also biotite and hornblende crystals. More rarely, a few macrocrystals of quartz (often patchy) or potassium feldspar can be found, but sometimes also augite.

== Origin and formation ==
Simplified Geological Map of the Estérel Coastal Area, from Saint-Raphael to île d'Or. p rhyolite rMi (Mitaux) Sedimentary Permian rPx (Pradineaux Formation) Sedimentary Permian 3aM (flow of mugearite) 3F (Sill of diabase) E (esterellite) K (hornfels) E2-3 (blocks and pebbles) Fx-z (alluvium) Z (artificial excavation of esterellite) (fault)

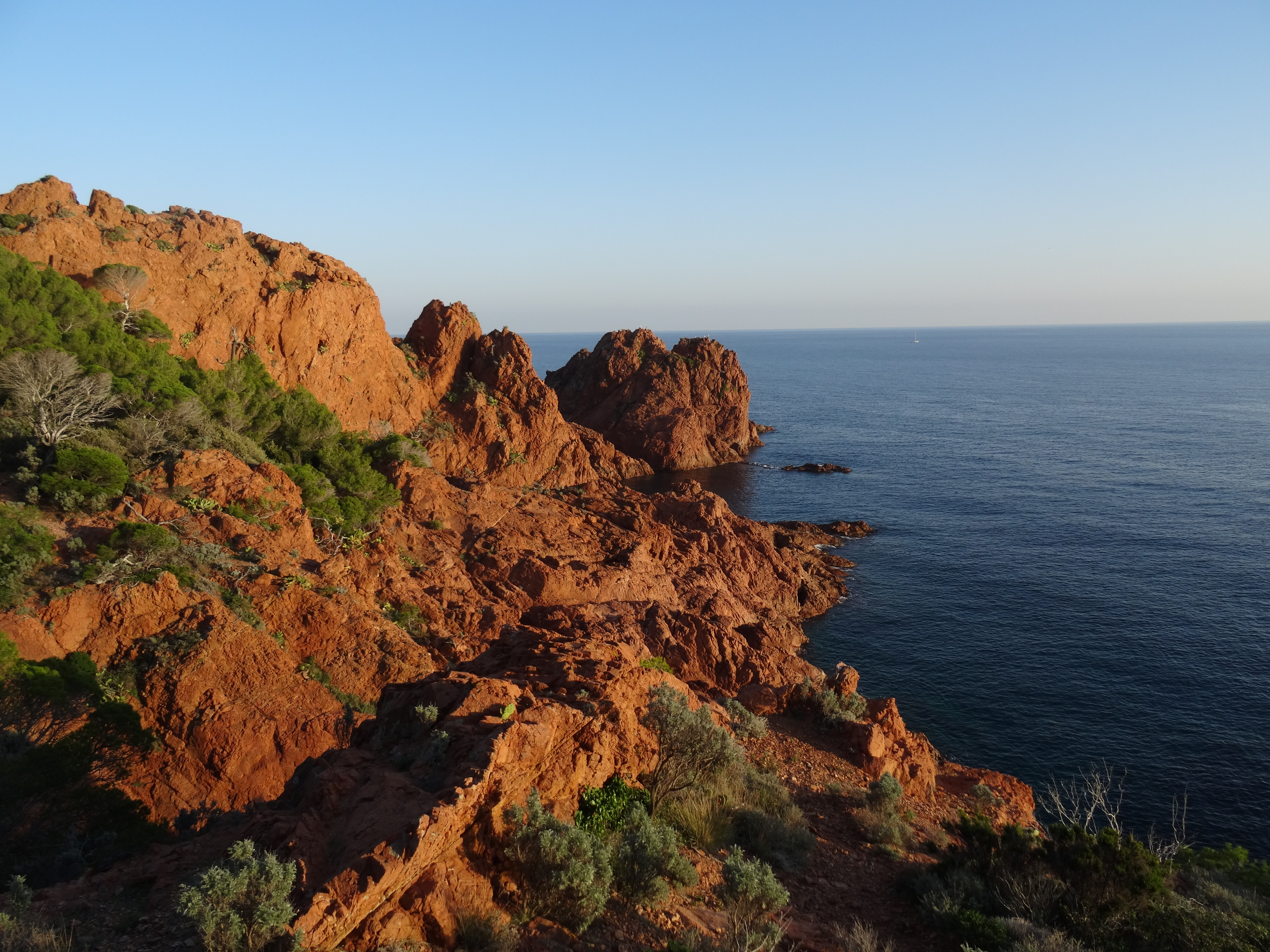
Vue of the Cap Dramont with the characteristic reddish colour of rhyolite

The Esterellite outcrops in the southern part of the Estérel massif, between Agay and Saint-Raphaël, in the form of a small sub-elliptical massif, about 6 km long and 3 km wide, oriented NW-SE, cutting through Permian volcanic-sedimentary formations. It forms the Dramont laccolith, which is interbedded with Permian sandstones.

While the bedrock of the Esterel dates back to the formation of the Hercynian chain (pre-Carboniferous), almost all the volcanic outcrops appeared 250 million years ago at the end of the Palaeozoic era (Permian). During this period, 30 million years of intense volcanic activity led to the formation of basalts and then red rhyolites (Maure-Vieil caldera: 43°30′36″N 6°54′0″E). In the Oligocene, a new magma eruption deposited the esterellite laccoliths of Cap Dramont. In the Miocene (23 to 5 million years ago), a tectonic movement separated Corsica and Sardinia from present-day Provence. The same porphyries are found in the Esterel as in the Calanques de Piana in Corsica. Since then, the massif has undergone considerable erosion. It is mainly composed of porphyritic rocks, especially rhyolite, which gives it its characteristic reddish colour with occasional veins of blue esterellite.

The Estérel massif has undergone two types of magmatisms:

- Permian calc-alkaline volcanism, characterized by ignimbritic rhyolites with large extensions, flow banded rhyolite and punctual rhyolites;
- Permian alkaline volcanism, characterized by dolerite-textured basalts and microlitic-textured trachyandesites, characteristic of the Massif des Maures and the Toulon region and the later intrusion of Esterellite in the Cap Dramont area.

The esterellite was formed from magma that was not very hot and under low pressure. The magma was therefore unable to reach the surface and formed a flattened magma chamber underground (laccolith), due to the strata between which the magma was forced to move and cooled down slowly. Over time, erosion of the overlying layers exposed these cooled magmatic rocks.

Named "porphyre bleu de l'Estérel" by Horace Bénédict de Saussure in 1796, the esterellite owes its present name to Auguste Michel-Lévy, who in 1897 devoted to it the most complete petrographic study of the 19th century. In the following decades, numerous authors studied the origin and characteristics of the esterellite, while the age of its formation gave rise to numerous controversies. Michel-Lévy (1912) and Roche (1957) favored a Tertiary age, while Bordet (1951) suggested a Permian age. It wasn't until the 1970s that the Tertiary age was finally accepted. between 61 and 53 Ma for Roubault (1970), Oligocene for Baubron (1974) and between 55 and 30 Ma for Giraud (1983). The French BRGM gives between 26.3 and 34.2 Ma citing Baubron (1974) and between 33 and 56 Ma, determined with the K/Ar dating, citing Bellon (1977) and Giraud (1983). Using ^{40}Ar/^{39}Ar dating, Féraud (1995) estimated the age of samples of esterellites from Le Dramont at 32.7 ± 0.9 Ma and concluded that they were produced during a brief and unique event affecting the outer and inner Alpine domains between the Mediterranean and the Saint Raphael area. This dating was confirmed by Ivaldi (2003) at 31.9 ± 0.7 Ma and by Réhault (2012) at 33-31 Ma.

The quartz-bearing microdiorite of Alghero (Cala Bona 40°32′41.91″N 8°19′16.11″E) shows close petrographic and chemical analogies to the esterellites of the Estérel Massif. The rock is very similar to the porphyry of Montagne Pelée in Martinique.

== Uses ==
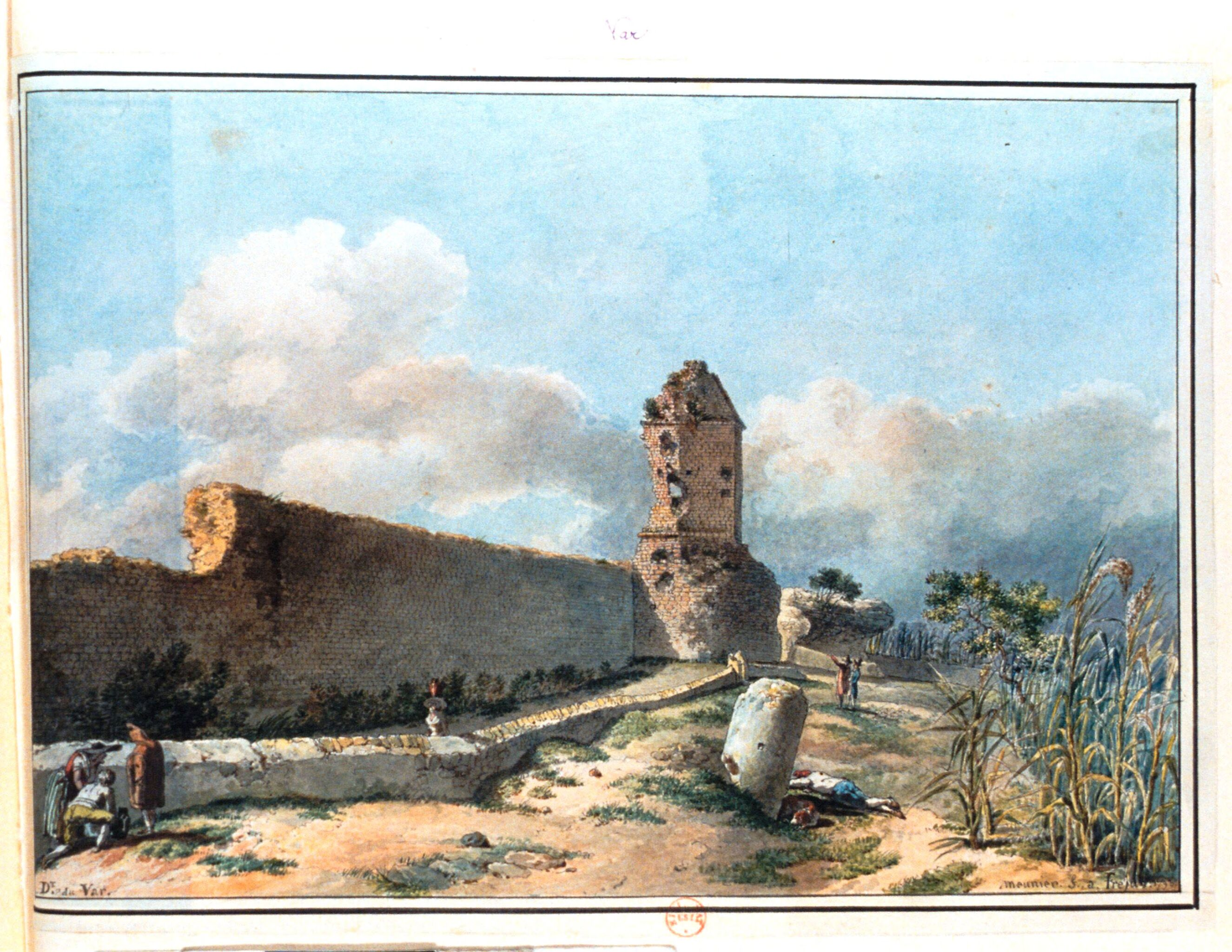
Watercolor by Antoine Meunier depicting the Lanterne d'Auguste, the windbreak wall and the esterelitte "pillar post" in the Roman port of Fréjus (1793)

Esterellite deposits were clearly visible along the coast between Boulouris and Agay and were easily accessible by sea. The Romans appreciated the solidity of esterellite. It was mainly used locally as building material due to the lack of limestone in the region, notably in the amphitheater of Fréjus and the aqueduct from Mons to Fréjus and as riprap in the antique port of Fréjus. It was also used in the form of cobblestones or gravel, as it was resistant to the hooped wheels of the chariots of the time and exported throughout France and Europe to build roads. The Romans also used it to decorate monuments in the south of France (Orange and Arles).

Later, this porphyry was in demand in Rome as an exotic import since the early 3rd century A.D. under the Severan dynasty, mainly for use in columns. The Roman quarries of Boulouris exported stones also known as Porfido bigio, Granito a morviglione or Porfido bigio di Sibilio. Charles Texier found three quarries in the Petits Caous sector, many traces of which were still preserved in 1849, before modern quarrying began in 1864.

The Baths of Caracalla in Rome and the Bath of the Six Columns in Ostia are known to have used it. In the Saint Peter's Basilica, the altar of the chapel of Pope St Gregory the Great is flanked by two remarkably large columns of esterellite coming from Boulouris quarries as well as the altar of Clementine chapel. A column of esterellite is also visible in the octagonal courtyard in the Vatican museums.

In the centuries that followed, it was used sparingly for decorative purposes in its production area of Fréjus, Vénasque, Cannes and Antibes, where it can be found in the form of columns and colonnettes, as well as pavements and wall coverings. There are also limited examples of reuse of antique columns in the Romanesque chapel of Saint-Nicolas in Die and in the colonnade of the cloister of the fortified Lérins Abbey on the Saint-Honorat island in the bay of Cannes.

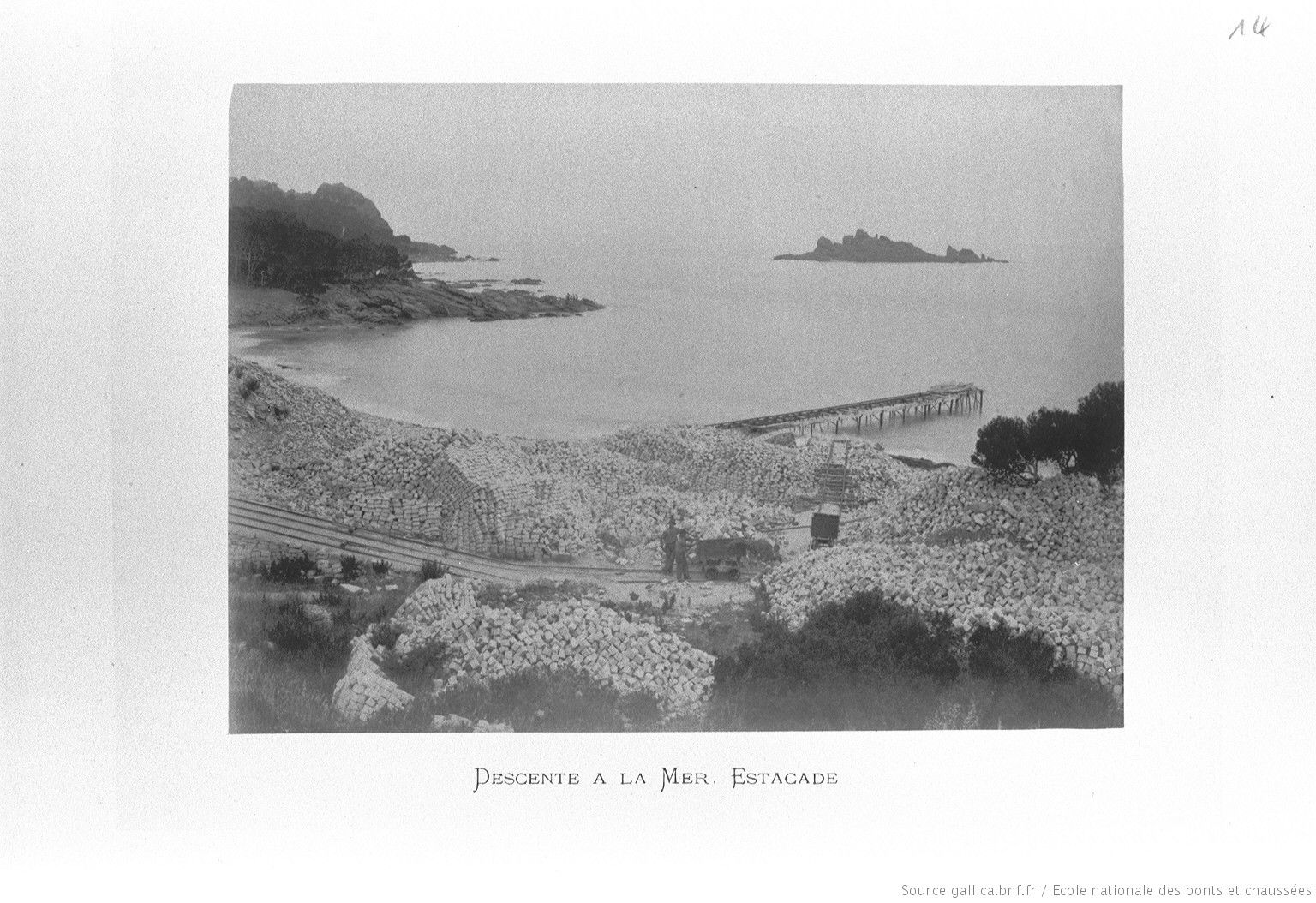
Pier of the "Carrière de porphyre de Saint-Raphaël" company at Cap Dramont (1870)

Since the 19th century, esterellite has been actively exploited for the manufacture of rubble stones (curbstones, paving stones,...). Its high compressive strengths, larger than 1,000 kg/cm^{2} (14,000 psi), makes it suitable for a wide range of uses. Its accelerated polishing coefficient makes it particularly suitable for motorway wearing courses. It has also been used sparingly for ornamental purposes, notably in 1877 in the Basilica of Notre-Dame de Fourvière in Lyon for the side doors of the Porte des Lions and for the octagonal columns of the organ loft in the choir of the basilica.

The resumption of the quarrying of esterellite at Le Dramont was made possible by the construction of the Marseille-Nice railway line by the Chemins de fer de Paris à Lyon et à la Méditerranée (PLM) next to the quarries. The section between Toulon and Les Arc was officially opened by the PLM on 1 September 1862 and the railway line reached Cagnes-sur-Mer on 10 April 1863. In 1864, the first quarrying concessions were granted by the prefect. In 1883, the company "Carrières de Porphyre de Saint-Raphaël" was founded when the Belgian entrepreneur Jules Dujaquier bought 45 hectares of land on the Dramont seafront (43°25′7.77″N 6°50′38.73″E) next to the railway line. In 1888, the company "Carrière de Prola" began extracting esterellite in a quarry overlooking the Bay of Agay (43°25′29.01″N 6°51′14.32″E). The "quarrymen's village", the future district of Le Dramont, housed the workers, most of whom were Italian. In the 1890s, local records show that paving stones were exported to modern-day Argentina, Bulgaria (Ruse), Romania (Brăila, Galați), Russia and Turkey. The 1920s saw the peak of the quarrying activity in the Dramont area: 800 of the village's 2,000 inhabitants worked in the quarries. In 1923, the "Carrières de Porphyre de Saint-Raphaël" owned 208 hectares and purchased in 1932 the Prola quarry which was afterwards connected to the main quarry by a Decauville line to transport the cobblestones by wagon.

The extraction of esterellite at Le Dramont ended in 1959. Since 2022, the "Maison des Carriers" museum in Saint-Raphaël retraces the industrial and human history of the site, which operated from 1864 to 1959.

In 1959, Pierre Delli-Zotti founded the Grands Caous quarry (Provençal for ‘heat’), which he sold to Eiffage in 1998. It covers 45 hectares and it is authorized to produce up to 800,000 tonnes per year until 2042 (location: 43°25′53″N 6°49′35″E). The esterellite of the Grands Caous quarry is mainly used for the production of ripraps, such as blocks for the dikes of the ports of Saint-Raphaël and Fréjus, railway ballast and road gravel.

== World War II ==
During World War II, the esterellite quarries were requisitioned by the Organisation Todt to supply materials for the construction of the Mediterranean Wall, along with some of the employees. To do this, the esterellite pebbles had to be transported from the beach to the crusher in small hand-loaded wagons loaded, pulled by small locomotives. This was a labor-intensive operation all along the Poussaï beach at Le Dramont. The quarry management insisted that the beach not be mined, for the safety of the quarry workers. This request contributed to the success of the Operation Dragoon. The Allies landed on 15 August 1944 on Camel Green, code name of the vast pebble beach at Le Dramont, formed by the cobbles left over from sixty years of quarrying. It was nicknamed the "Quarry beach" by the soldiers.

Allies landing on Camel green beach, the esterellite quarry at Dramont, during Operation Dragoon

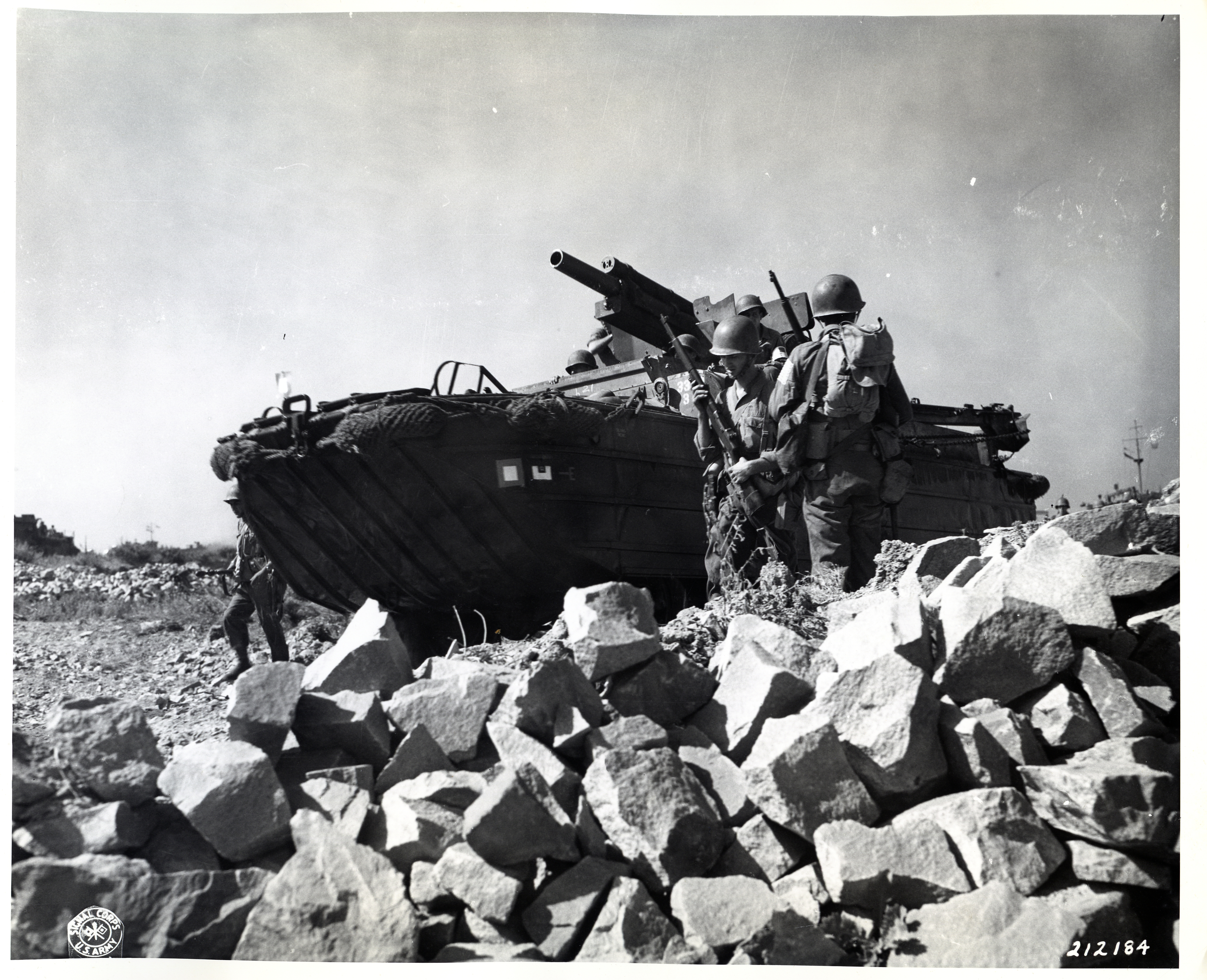

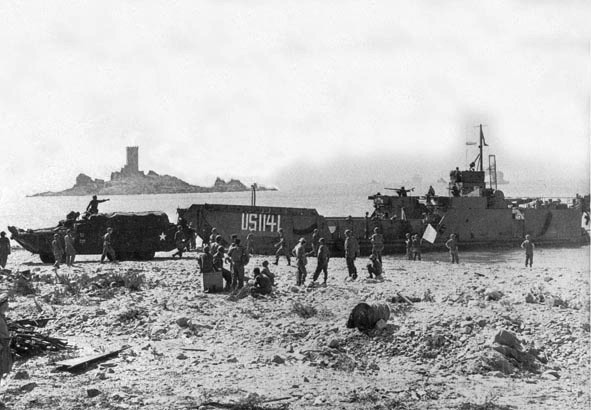

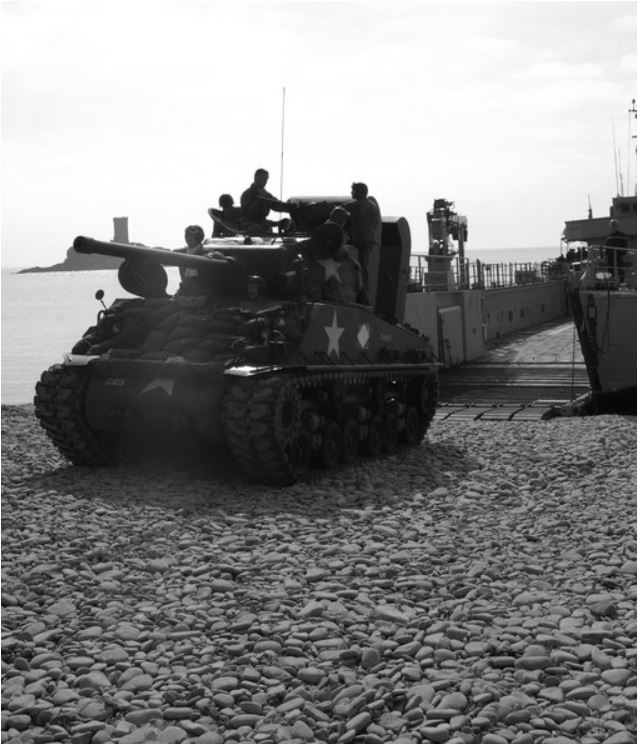

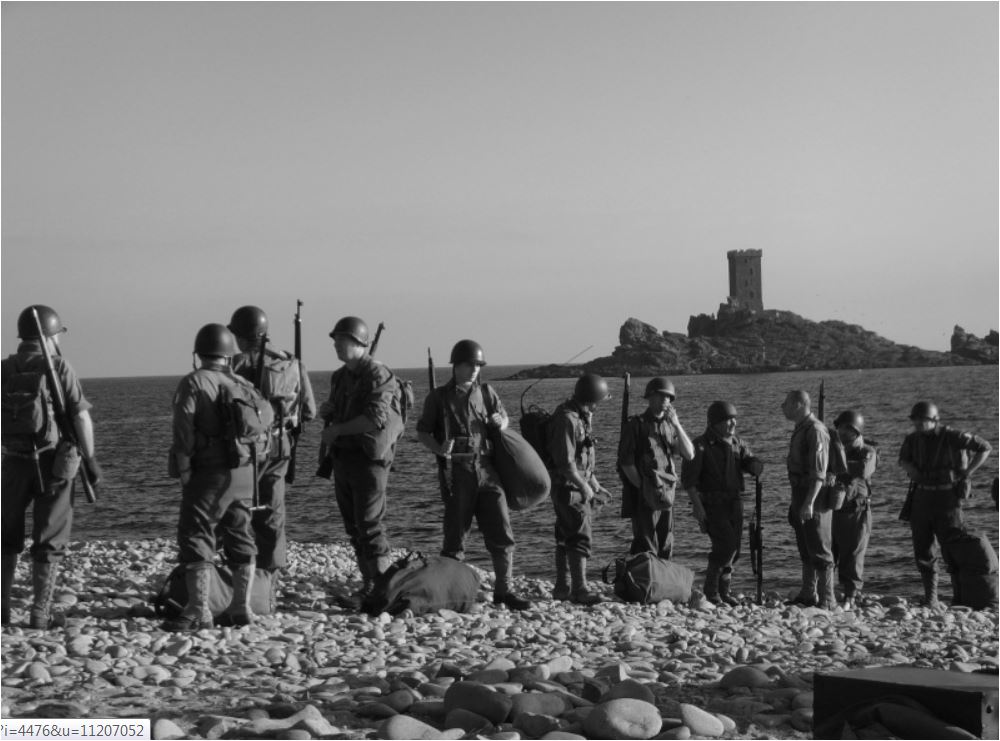

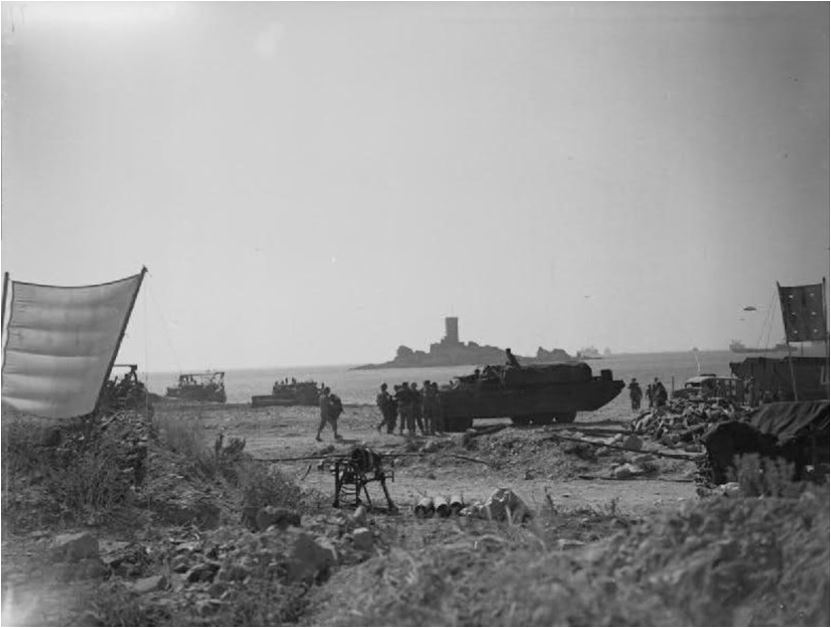

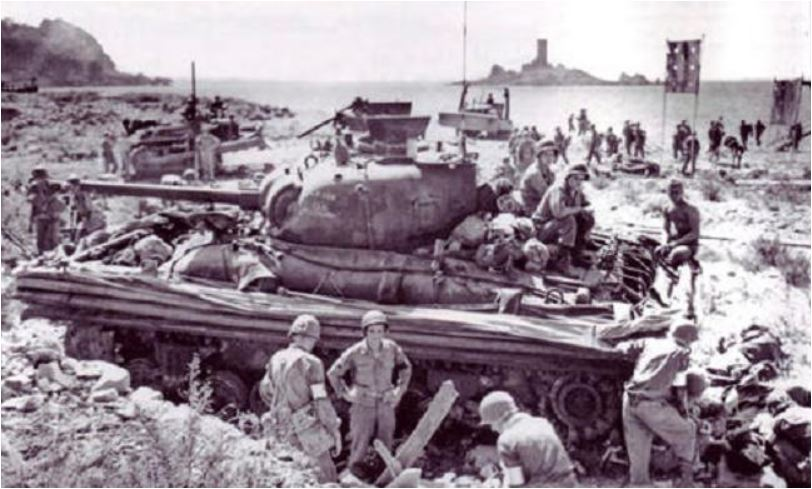

== See also ==
- Napoleonite
