= Napoleon Bonaparte (disambiguation) =

Napoleon Bonaparte (1769–1821) was a French military leader and emperor.

Napoleon Bonaparte may also refer to:

- Napoléon Charles Bonaparte (1802–1807), prince of Holland and son of Napoleon I's brother Louis
- Napoleon III (1808–1873) emperor of France and son of Napoleon I's brother Louis
- Napoléon Louis Bonaparte (1804–1831), king of Holland and son of Napoleon I's brother Louis
- Prince Napoléon-Jérôme Bonaparte (1822–1891), son of Napoleon I's brother Jerome
- Napoléon Charles Bonaparte, 5th Prince of Canino (1839–1899), grandson of Napoleon I's brother Lucien
- Napoleon Bonaparte (fictional detective), a character created by Arthur Upfield
- Napoleon Bonaparte (police officer) (1965–2026), Indonesian police officer

== See also ==
- Bonaparte (disambiguation)
- List of French privateers named for Napoleon Bonaparte
- Napoleon (disambiguation)
- Napoleon Bonaparte Buford (1807–1883), U.S. Army officer and railroad executive
- Napoleon Bonaparte Brown (1834–1910), American businessman and politician
- Napoleon Bonaparte Broward (1857–1910), U.S. Governor of Florida from 1905 to 1909
- Napoleon Bunny-Part, 1956 Bugs Bunny cartoon
