= Prince Napoléon (disambiguation) =

Prince Napoléon is a title of the House of Bonaparte, an imperial and royal European dynasty founded in 1804 .

Prince Napoléon may also refer to:

- Victor, Prince Napoléon (1862–1926), pretender to the Imperial Throne of France
- Louis, Prince Napoléon (1914–1997), pretender to the Imperial Throne of France
- Charles, Prince Napoléon (born 1950)
- Jean-Christophe, Prince Napoléon (born 1986)

== See also ==
- House of Bonaparte
- Napoleon (disambiguation)
