= French ship Napoléon =

Two ships of the French Navy have borne the name Napoléon in honour of Napoléon I

- Corse (1850), a steam aviso, bore the name before being commissioned in the French Navy
- French battleship Napoléon (1850), the first purpose-built steam battleship in the world

== See also ==
- List of French privateers named for Napoleon Bonaparte
- Napoléon-class ship of the line, of the French Navy
- Napoleon (ship), various ships
