= List of French privateers named for Napoleon Bonaparte =

Several privateers during the Age of Sail were named for Napoleon Bonaparte:

- Buonoparte was a 16-gun privateer, commissioned in Brest in 1796 with 137 to 167 men and 16 guns. HMS Santa Margarita captured her on 24 October 1796, south of Ireland. Buonoparte was the former packet King George, probably the one captured in 1794.
- Bonaparte was a privateer commissioned in Dunkirk in December 1796 under Jean Meulenaer, with 24 men and 10 to 15 guns. After a first cruise between December 1796 and January 1797, she sortied again in February with a 110-man crew. HMS Espion and Martin captured her on 14 February 1797.
- Buonaparte was a 32-tonne privateer cutter commissioned in Saint-Malo in 1797 under F. Roussel, with 32 men and 3 guns. HMS Ambuscade captured her in the Caribbean circa June 1797.
- Bonaparte was a lugger requisitioned at Anconna in March 1797 and commissioned in the French Navy as an aviso with six 6-pounders. She was last mentioned while at Bonifacio in April 1799. She might have become the aviso Redoutable, commissioned at Bastia on 8 May 1800 that the British captured near Pantalleria in June 1800.
- Bonaparte was a privateer commissioned in Boulogne in May 1799. She did two cruises, from May to July 1799, and from October 1799 to March 1800, under Jean-Baptist Pollet, with 46 men.
- Bonaparte was a "privateer frigate" commissioned in October 1797 under a Captain Lamotte, with 250 men and 32 guns.
- Bonaparte was an 8-gun schooner commissioned as a privateer and captured in 1799 in the Atlantic by the USS Merrimack.
- Bonaparte was a 75-ton, 14-gun privateer brig commissioned in Bayonne in June 1797 under Louis Boulager. She did a cruise from June 1797 to March 1798 with 10 to 13 officers and 62 to 67 men.
- Bonaparte was a privateer trincadour commissioned in Bayonne in 1798 or 1799 under a Captain Lazue or Lazuc. She cruised in February 1799 with a 15-man crew.
- Bonaparte was a privateer from an unknown home port, operating in the Mediterranean in early 1798, with 40 men and 2 guns. HMS Lively captured her in February 1798.
- Bonaparte was a privateer from an unknown home port, operating off Genoa in April 1799.
- Bonaparte was a privateer commissioned in Guadeloupe in January 1798. USS United States captured her off Martinique in 1799.
- Bonaparte was a privateer commissioned in Guadeloupe in September or October 1799 under Ensign Pierre Martin, with 30 men and twelve 4-pounder guns. She engaged British forces off Porto Rico on 14 October 1799. Two days later, HMS Echo captured her.
- Bonaparte was a privateer from an unknown homeport, operating in the Caribbean in early 1799, with 50 men and 6 guns. A British squadron under Admiral Parker captured her in March 1799.
- Bonaparte was a 58-ton privateer built in Honfleur by Nicolas Loquet and commissioned in Rouen in 1798 under Captain Degaule. From 4 April to 23 June 1798, she was requisitioned by the French Navy, and manned by a 3-officer and 25-man crew. She might be the 72-man, 8-gun Bonaparte that HMS Concorde and HMS Lapwing captured in November 1798.
- Invincible General Bonaparte was a French privateer of 20 guns and 170 men that the frigate HMS Boadicea captured on 9 December 1798 and that the Royal Navy took into service as HMS Brazen.
- Invincible Napoleon (1804 ship) (or Invincible Bonaparte, or later Invincible), which the British Royal Navy captured three times and American privateers captured twice.
- HMS Pert was the French privateer Bonaparte that HMS Cyane captured in November 1804. Pert was wrecked in October 1807 off the coast of what is now Venezuela.
- HMS Dominica (1805) was a schooner purchased in 1805, whose crew mutinied in 1806 and turned her over to the French who sent her out as the privateer Napoleon. Within four days of the mutiny Wasp had recaptured her; she was taken back into service under her original name and broken up in 1808.
- Napoléon, ex-Bonaparte, was a three-masted privateer from Saint-Malo built in 1803 and 1804, and commissioned at Saint-Servan in January 1805. Her draft was 3.35 metre empty, and 4.87 metre when fully loaded; she was of 400 tons (French; "of load"). She was armed with 28 guns (four 8-pounders, six 6-pounders, sixteen 32-pounder carronades, and two 36-pounder obusiers. she sailed to Isle de France (Mauritius) under Malo-Jean Le Nouvel with 147 to 180 men. She then made two more cruises from Ile de France with 180 to 250 men, and 32 guns. She ran aground on 23 November 1806 at Hood Bay while under fire from HMS Narcissus and another British frigate; Napoléon's crew managed to escape.
- Grand Napoléon was a settee, pierced for 10 guns but only four mounted, with a crew of 38 men, that HMS Pylades captured on 2 May 1808.
- Grand Napoléon was a privateer commissioned in Boulogne in March 1806. She cruised under Captain Huret from January to February 1808, and later under a captain Fourmentin.
- Grand Napoléon was from Boulogne, purchased for 25,000 francs from a Mr. Foube from Calais and commissioned in September 1808. Under Pierre-Marie Wasselin she cruised with 68 men from September 1808 to February 1809, and under Antoine Huret, with 55 men, she cruised from June 1809 to November 1809. HMS Royalist captured her on 17 November 1809; she was armed with 18 guns and had a crew of 75 men.
- Grand Napoléon, of Nantes, and about 240 tons (bm), was three months old when HMS Helena captured her on 19 April 1810. Grand Napoleon was armed with twelve 18-pounder carronades and four long guns. She had a crew of 124 men.
- HMS Swaggerer was the French privateer Bonaparte (or Napoleon), captured in 1809 (or 1808). She served the Royal Navy in the Leeward Islands until broken up in 1815.
- Napoleon (alias Diaboloten), of 10 guns, was a vessel the Royal Navy captured at Malaga on 29 May 1812.
- Grand Napoleon, Howard, master, was a new American letter of marque schooner of 305 tons (bm), four guns, and 32 men, that HMS Belle Poule captured on 3 April 1813.

== See also ==
- Premier Consul (1800)
- French ship Napoleon
- Napoleon (ship)
