= Age of Napoleon (board game) =

Board game

- Manufacturers: Mayfair Games, Phalanx Games
- Designers: Renaud Verlaque
- Publication: 2003
- Genres: Board game, war and strategy
- Players: 2

Age of Napoleon is a 2003 war and strategy board game created in collaboration between Mayfair Games and Phalanx Games. It focuses on the Napoleonic Wars in Europe from 1805 to 1815. The game's designer is Renaud Verlaque and its artist is Franz Vohwinkel.

Although its focus is a real world event, it is not designed to be an accurate simulation of history. Instead it is designed to provide balanced and streamlined gameplay.

== Gameplay ==
Age of Napoleon is designed for 2 players. One player controls the First French Empire and its allies and the other player controls the countries of the Coalition, led by Great Britain. The other major countries, Spain, the Kingdom of Prussia, the Russian Empire, and the Austrian Empire, along with 13 minor countries, can repeatedly change sides during the course of the game.

The two sides, France and the Coalition, fight on the battlefield with units representing armies, and compete using diplomacy, for control of these countries in order to gain dominance in Europe. Both players may also use cards that represent various events or actions that they can use to change the diplomatic situation of Europe, aid their armies or harm their opponent's armies in battle or movement, and aid their positions in other ways.

=== Army Units ===
The armies used to move around the board, fight battles, and conquer territories are made up by units that each represent a corps of about 40,000 soldiers.

Each of a country's corps is led and named by a real-life general. To represent the different skills and seniorities of each general, each corps is defined by three numbers, that corps's Battle Rating (the fighting ability of that corps), Movement Rating (the speed that the corps is able to move across land), and the Seniority Rating (the seniority of the general that leads the corps).

=== Diplomatic Alignment ===
Each country in Age of Napoleon begins with a certain diplomatic alignment, corresponding generally to their alliances or enemies in real life. This alignment can change during the game through war or diplomacy. There are five possible diplomatic alignments for every country:

- A Coalition Member country is one that is an independent ally of Britain, and thus is under direct control of the Coalition player.
- An Insurgent Country is one previously controlled by France that is fighting a rebellion against France. Insurgent Countries are under partial control of the Coalition player.
- A Neutral Country is one that has no political allies or enemies. These countries are under control of neither player and thus does not participate in war or diplomacy.
- A French Dominion is a country that has been directly annexed to France. French Dominions are under direct control of the French player.
- A French Ally is a country that is independent and allied to France. These countries are under direct control of the French player.

=== Setup ===
Age of Napoleon has 3 set starting setups, starting from 1805, 1809, and 1813. The placement of units on the board and the alignment of various countries generally match the real-life situation at the start of that year. Although the diplomatic situation and the placement of armies on the board are constant in every game of a certain starting setup, the cards that each player has available to use differ.

=== Course of Play ===
The gameplay of Age of Napoleon is divided into 'years' that correspond to years of the war in reality. Each year is divided into 8 "phases":

- In the Diplomacy Phase, the players can play cards that change the diplomatic alignment of countries to their advantage.
- In the Insurrection Phase, the Coalition player can start insurrections, or rebellions, in certain countries controlled by France.
- In the Strategy Phase, the players receive new cards to use through the rest of the year.
- In the Reinforcement Phase, the players deploy reinforcements to their armies on the board.
- In the Campaign Phase, the players move their armies and fight battles with them.
- In the Surrender Phase, countries can surrender if they have been conquered by opposing armies and will change alignment.
- In the Winter Attrition Phase, large armies on the board experience losses due to starvation and lack of supplies in winter.
- In the Victory Check Phase, the players determine whether either of them has won.

== Historicity ==
Although Age of Napoleon is designed for fun and streamlined gameplay, it includes many realistic elements in order to enhance the historical feel.

=== The map ===
The territorial boundaries are inspired by the Napoleonic era. Besides France, all of the coalition members (Britain, Prussia, Austria, and Russia) as well as many other historical countries are in the game. The outlines of Spain, Portugal, Switzerland, and the United Kingdom broadly correspond to their historical configurations. However, the borders of other countries are largely fictional or inspired by the political map of the 21st-century. Many of the minor states in Italy and Germany are not represented, and are conglomerated into larger states in order to increase playability. Additionally, the British colony of Gibraltar and the Danish colony of Norway are not shown on the map. Significant historical inaccuracies can be identified by region:

- Western Europe: Territories such as the Rhineland, North Brabant, Limburg, Zeeland, Piedmont, Liguria, and the Aosta Valley were under French control in 1805 and the preceding years. However, the game map does not reflect this. Instead, it merges the modern territories of France, Belgium, and Luxembourg into the First French Empire.
- Central Europe: The territory labeled as Saxony does not align with the historical or modern region; it is instead placed in what is Lower Bavaria. The regions of Holstein and Schleswig were tied to Denmark through a personal union, which is not represented. The game's representation of Swedish Pommerania (referred to as "Pommerania") is oversized, and mostly covers territory which was historically Prussian. Its depiction as a distinct region with own diplomacy misleadingly suggests political autonomy from Sweden, which it did not possess. Additionally, Prussia's eastern borders follow those of modern Poland, not the historical Prussian state. Consequently, northern East Prussia - including the city of Königsberg - is shown as part of Russian Lithuania.
- Southern Europe: In the early 19th century, Wallachia and Moldavia were still vassal states of the Ottoman Empire. The game inaccurately represents these regions as Austrian territories. This has mechanical implications within the game, as it allows British troops to land there and treats the region as friendly to Austrian and allied forces.

Furthermore, there are a few errors in naming regions.

One important feature of the game that increases its historical accuracy are the inclusion of "detachable areas" of Prussia and Austria, Saxony and Poland (under France known as the Duchy of Warsaw) for Prussia and Tirol and Dalmatia for Austria. These are areas that begin as constituent regions of their respective powers, but can be separated to form a separate minor country upon the major country's conquest by the French player. This feature adds some historical accuracy because in the real Napoleonic Wars, France did form minor countries allied to it from these areas of Austria and Prussia. However, in reality, Saxony was not part of Prussia, but was only heavily influenced by it. Furthermore, the area detached by Napoleon to form the Duchy of Warsaw included areas of both Austria and Prussia, but this is not reflected in the game.

In Age of Napoleon, another historical feature is the inclusion of general geographic conditions of each area. Some areas are marked as mountainous or swampy, which inhibits movement of armies into and through these areas. The mountainous areas are the Alps and Carpathian Mountains, the swamps represent the Pripet marshes. Also, some areas are marked as barren, meaning that the infrastructure and agriculture there are not as developed, indicating that they cannot support a large army, leading to larger losses in winter. Both of these rules are of course not perfect, but they provide added realism and historical accuracy.

=== Diplomacy ===
Diplomacy in Age of Napoleon is mainly completed through cards that change the diplomatic alignment of one country one stage (from hostile to neutral or from neutral to allied). The cards each player receives every turn is random, so with some luck, it is possible for the tide of war to change through one side's diplomacy.

There are also limits to the use of diplomacy, restricting what countries each player can coerce to join their side. Obviously, France and Britain are immune to diplomacy of the opposing side, because they would never in real life have joined forces. Also, French dominions and occupied neutrals are impervious to the opponent's diplomacy because they are essentially completely integrated parts of major powers. Finally, Prussia, Austria, and Russia are immune to France's diplomatic efforts before they are forced to surrender through conquest to France because they would not have initially allied with France in real life before they were violently convinced.

Another feature of diplomacy in the Age of Napoleon is that the Coalition player can instigate armed revolutions in parts of the French empire (French dominions and occupied neutral countries), reflecting Britain's historical aid to the revolutions against Napoleon's rule most notably in Spain and France. When an insurrection has begun, the country is under limited Coalition control and the revolution can only be defeated by France if French armies occupy most of the territories of the country, simulating putting down violence and dissent by the citizens.

=== Movement ===
During the game, it is crucial that the players move their armies in order to attack opponents. Each general can only move a certain number of spaces each turn, and fewer if the movement is to attack the opponent's armeis, representing the difficulty of planning attacks. Furthermore, swamps and mountains inhibit movement. If an army is moved too far too quickly, through mountains or swamps, or during winter, the army can experience attrition and losses due to exhaustion and difficulty of movement.

Intending to simulate Britain's naval dominance after the Battle of Trafalgar, in which the French navy was severely damaged, dashing Napoleon's hopes of sea superiority and invading Britain, only the Coalition player may move forces by sea. Thus it is impossible for Britain to be invaded and ever be forced to surrender by France, just as it had become in history.

Another added degree of historical accuracy in this game is that just as it was in history, troops could be moved from Sweden to Russia and back across the Baltic Sea during winter, when the Baltic sea was frozen over.

=== Combat ===
In the Age of Napoleon board game, combat is resolved by adding up the strengths of all the forces in each army, then rolling one die, and checking with a table in order to determine the number of losses inflicted by each side. Because only one die is rolled in combat, it is possible for a small army to defeat a much larger force through some amount of luck. The winner is the player who inflicted more losses on the opponent, who is forced to retreat.

Because it was easier to fight in one's own country due to familiarity of the land and support of the people, armies are considered to be stronger when located in their home countries. However, if an army has been in a battle recently or has done a great deal of marching recently, they will have lower combat strength, simulating the army's exhaustion and lack of supplies.

=== Resolution ===
A fairly unique feature of this game not present in many others is the inclusion of varying degrees of victory. Just as in history, at the conclusion of a war, one side usually did not emerge with complete dominance over the other. This is reflected in the game that each side can win a marginal or decisive victory, depending on their fortunes in war by the end of the game. Another historical element is that if one side achieves a marginal victory, it has the option of continuing on in order to achieve a decisive victory instead of immediately ending the game. However, if, later on, that side begins to lose, they cannot claim their earlier marginal victory.

==== French Victory ====
For France to achieve a marginal victory, it must control all countries bordering France and either Austria or Russia. Also, none of the major powers except Britain can be aligned to the Coalition. This would be realistic, because France would have secured its position of power over most of Continental Europe and Napoleonic France would continue for at least a few decades.

For France to achieve a decisive victory, it must control all major countries except Britain, representing that France has achieved completely hegemony over Europe and it will be nearly impossible for it to be defeated in the foreseeable future.

==== Coalition Victory ====
For the Coalition to achieve a marginal victory, France has to be restricted to its natural borders, essentially only France itself and a small part of what is today Germany and Belgium. This situation represents that although the French Empire has survived, it has lost its position as the most powerful nation in Europe and will likely never be able to again dominate the continent.

For the Coalition to achieve a decisive victory, France must surrender to Coalition armies. This is the result that occurred in reality, and ended with the restoration of the monarchy in France and it taking decades for France to recover its position as a stable and powerful world power.

Another historical rule, although optional, in the game is that if France surrenders, Napoleon can revive it into another war against the Coalition, preventing a decisive Coalition victory, simulating the historical Hundred Days. However, France is at an extreme disadvantage, with every single European country beginning as allied to the Coalition.

== Awards ==
Age of Napoleon was nominated for and won the 2003 Charles S. Roberts Award for Best Pre-World War II Boardgame.

In addition, it won the 2003 Walter Luc Haas Award for Best Simulation.

== See also ==
- Napoleonic Wars
- List of board wargames
