= Napoleon sweets =

Type of candy mostly from the Benelux

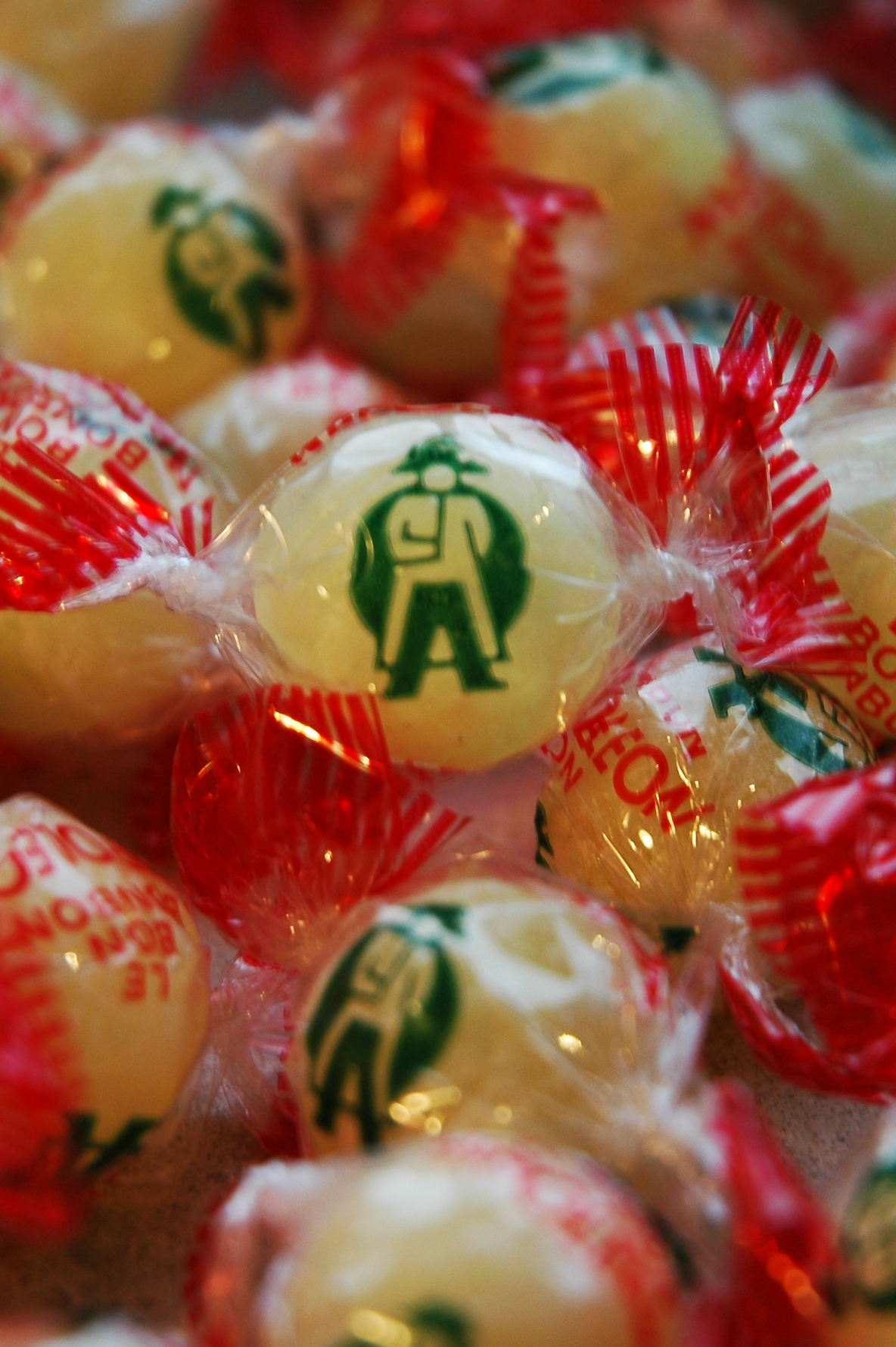
"Le Bon bonbon Napoléon"

The Napoleon (or Napoleon sweets, or Napoleon candy or bonbons Napoleon), is a small Belgian sweet with a lightly acidic core originating in Antwerp, produced in Breskens in the Netherlands.

It was created in 1912 by the baker Louis Janssen. He named it after Napoleon Bonaparte, probably inspired by another contemporary candy named Julius Caesar.

It is sold only in Benelux and in the north of France and in certain E. Leclerc stores as well as in Sweden. In addition to the original lemon, it is available in liquorice, caramel creme, raspberry, orange, cappuccino, apple, cola, and mixed fruits. It has been featured in the Netherlands edition of 'Universal Yums'.
