= Napoleonite =

Variety of diorite with orbicular structure

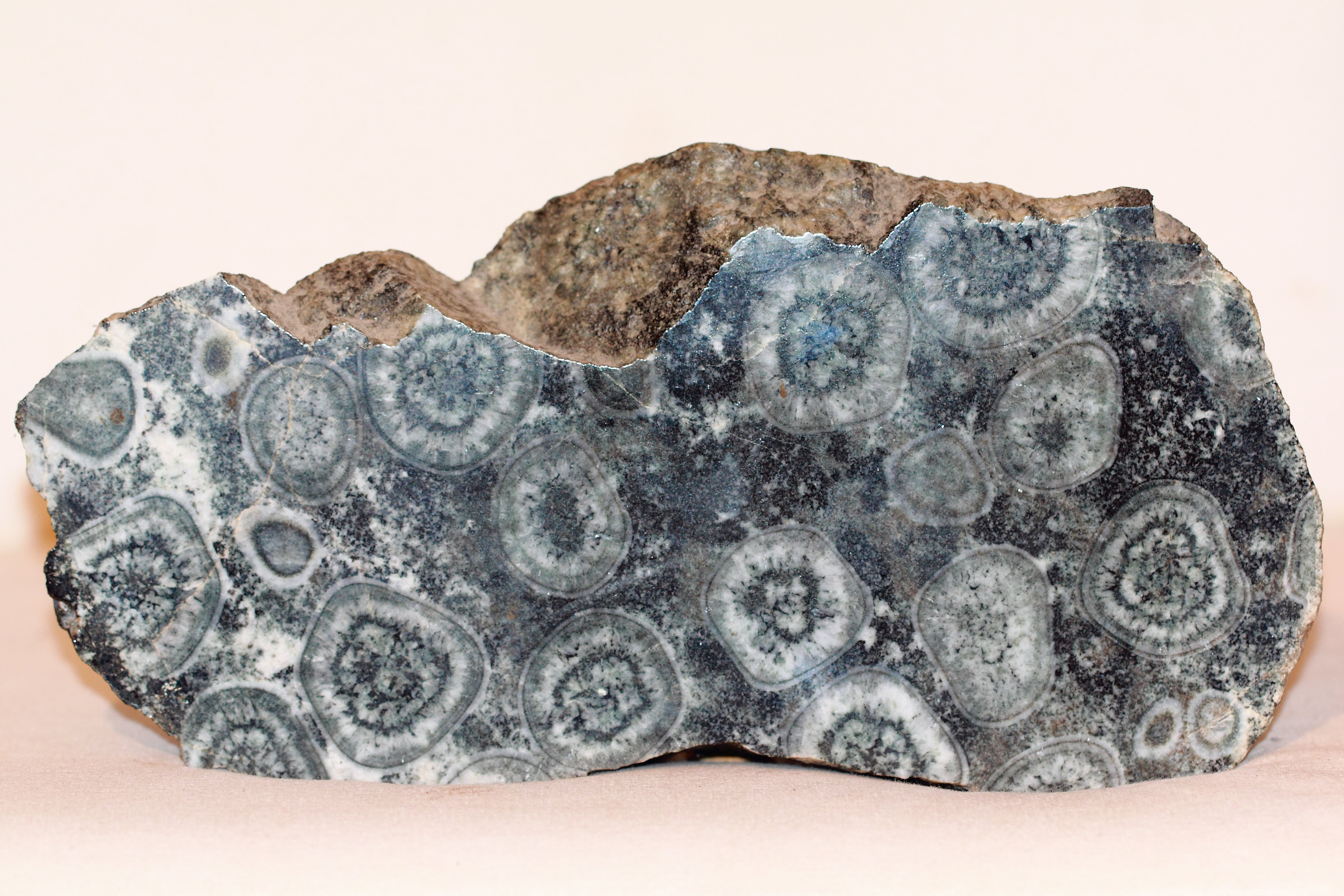
A fragment of napoleonite showing its orbicular structure.

Napoleonite is a variety of diorite. It is also called corsite because the stone is found in the island of Corsica.

== Description ==
Napoleonite is a variety of diorite which is characterized by orbicular structure. The grey matrix of the stone has the normal appearance of a diorite, but contains many rounded lumps 1 or 2 inches in diameter, which show concentric zones of light and dark colors. In these spheroids also a distinct and well-marked radial arrangement of the crystals is apparent. The center of the spheroid is usually white or pale grey and consists mainly of feldspar; the same mineral makes the pale zones while the dark ones are rich in hornblende and pyroxene. The feldspar is a basic variety of plagioclase (anorthite or bytownite). Though mostly rounded, the spheroids may be elliptical or subangular; sometimes they are in contact with one another but usually they are separated by small areas of massive diorite.

== Uses ==
When cut and polished the rock can become an ornamental stone. It has been used for making paperweights and other small decorative items.

== Spheroidal structure ==
Spheroidal structure is found in other diorites and in quite a number of granites in various places, such as Sweden, Russia, America, Sardinia and Ireland. It is by no means common, however, and usually occurs in only a small part of a granitic or dioritic mass, being sometimes restricted to an area of a few square yards. In most cases it is found near the center of the outcrop, though exceptionally it has been found quite close to the margin. It arises evidently from intermittent and repeated crystallization of the rock-forming minerals in successive stages.

== Formation ==
Such a process would be favored by complete rest, which would allow of supersaturation of the magma by one of the components. Rapid crystallization would follow, producing deposits on any suitable nuclei, and the crystals then formed might have a radial disposition on the surfaces on which they grew. The magma might then be greatly impoverished in this particular substance, and another deposit of a different kind would follow, producing a zone of different color. The nucleus for the spheroidal growth is sometimes an early porphyritic crystal, sometimes an enclosure of gneiss, et cetera, and often does not differ essentially in composition from the surrounding rock. When spheroids are in contact their inner zones may be distinct while the outer ones are common to both individuals having the outlines of a figure of eight. This proves that growth was centrifugal, not centripetal. Many varieties of spheroids are described presenting great differences in composition and in structure. Some are merely rounded balls consisting of the earliest minerals of the rock, such as apatite, zircon, biotite and hornblende, and possessing no regular arrangement. Others have as centers a foreign fragment such as gneiss or hornfels, with one or more zones, pale or dark, around this. Radial arrangement of the crystals, though often very perfect, is by no means universal. The spheroids are sometimes flattened or egg-shaped, apparently by the flow of magma at a time when they were semi-solid or plastic. As a general rule the spheroids are more basic and richer in the iron-magnesium minerals than the surrounding rock, though some of the zones are often very rich in quartz and feldspar. Graphic or perthitic intergrowths between the minerals of a zone are frequent. The spheroids vary in width up to 1 or 2 ft. In some cases they contain abnormal constituents such as calcite, sillimanite or corundum.

== See also ==
- Esterellite
