= Agay =

Neighborhood in Saint-Raphaël, France

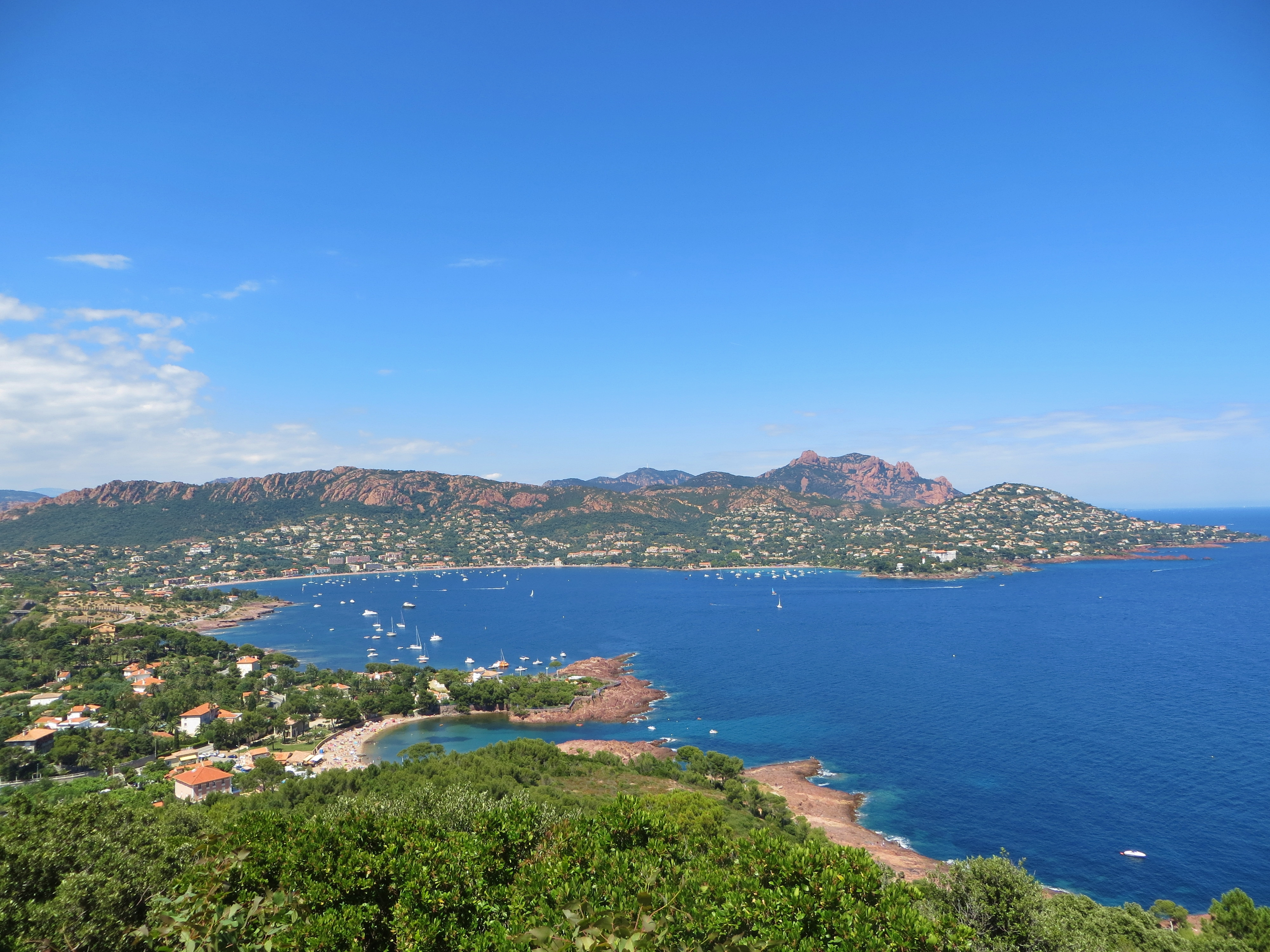
Agay as seen from Le Dramont mountain (facine north)

Agay is a village district of Saint-Raphaël in the south-east of France in the Var department in the Provence-Alpes-Côte d'Azur region. Agay is located directly on the coast of the Côte d'Azur (French riviera).

== Situation ==
Agay is 9 kilometres (5.6 mi) east of Saint-Raphaël and 35 kilometres (22 mi) west of Cannes. Due to its location on the Mediterranean, it is a popular tourist destination, but is less visited than Saint-Tropez and Nice, which are in the immediate vicinity.

Agay is a natural harbour, i.e., a bay wider than its opening to the sea, allowing ships to anchor calmly. The bay of Agay is almost circular (in two juxtaposed circles), facing south, and protected from the wind by the hills that surround it, culminating rapidly at 287 metres (942 ft) (Rastel d'Agay). The bay lies at the heart of the massif de l'Esterel, a volcanic mountain range of low altitude but steep slopes, criss-crossed by a major network of faults running in two perpendicular directions, north–south and west–east.

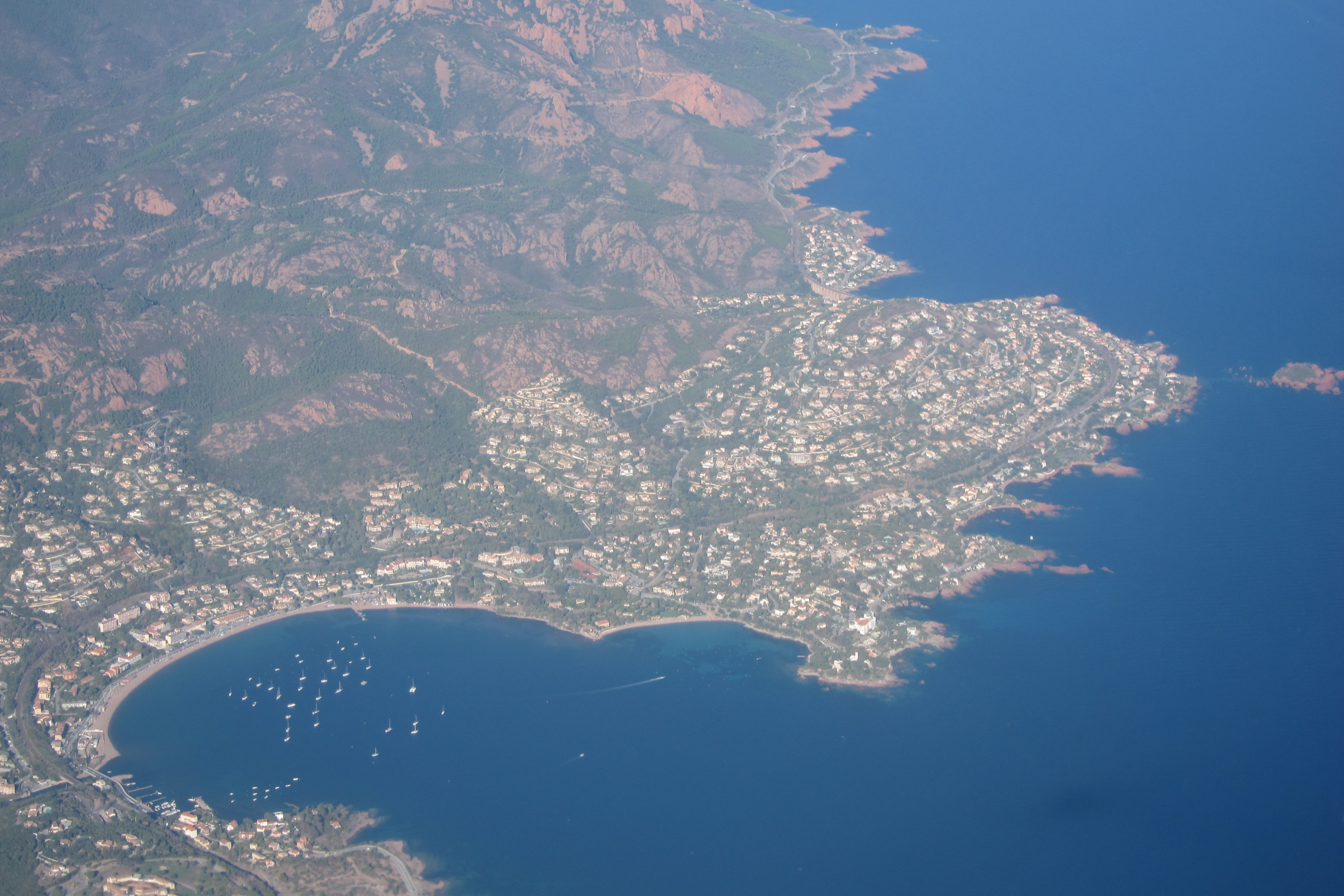
Agay and Antheor from plane view.

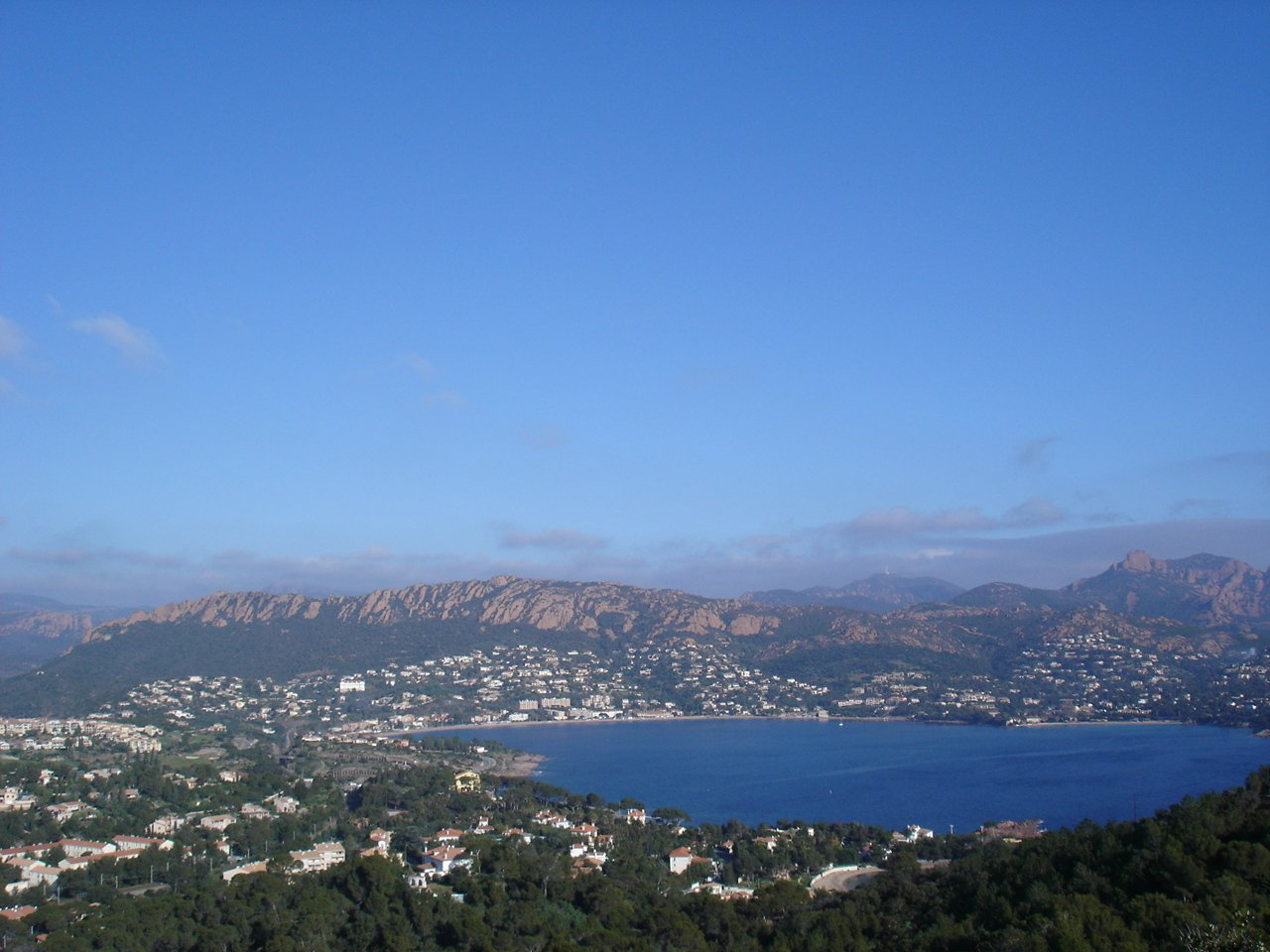
The bay and the Rastel d'Agay, along with the massif de l'Esterel in the background.

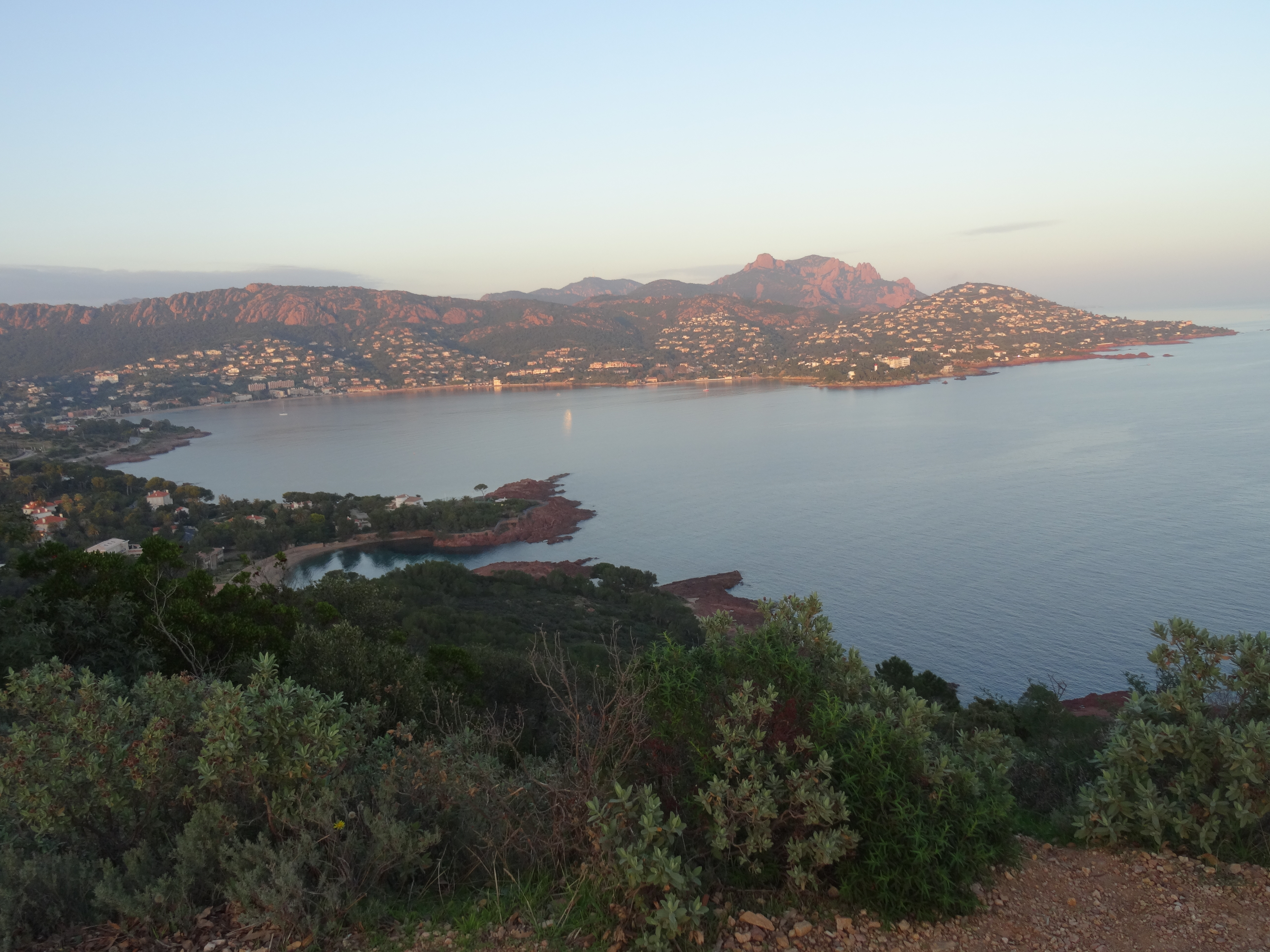
Other view

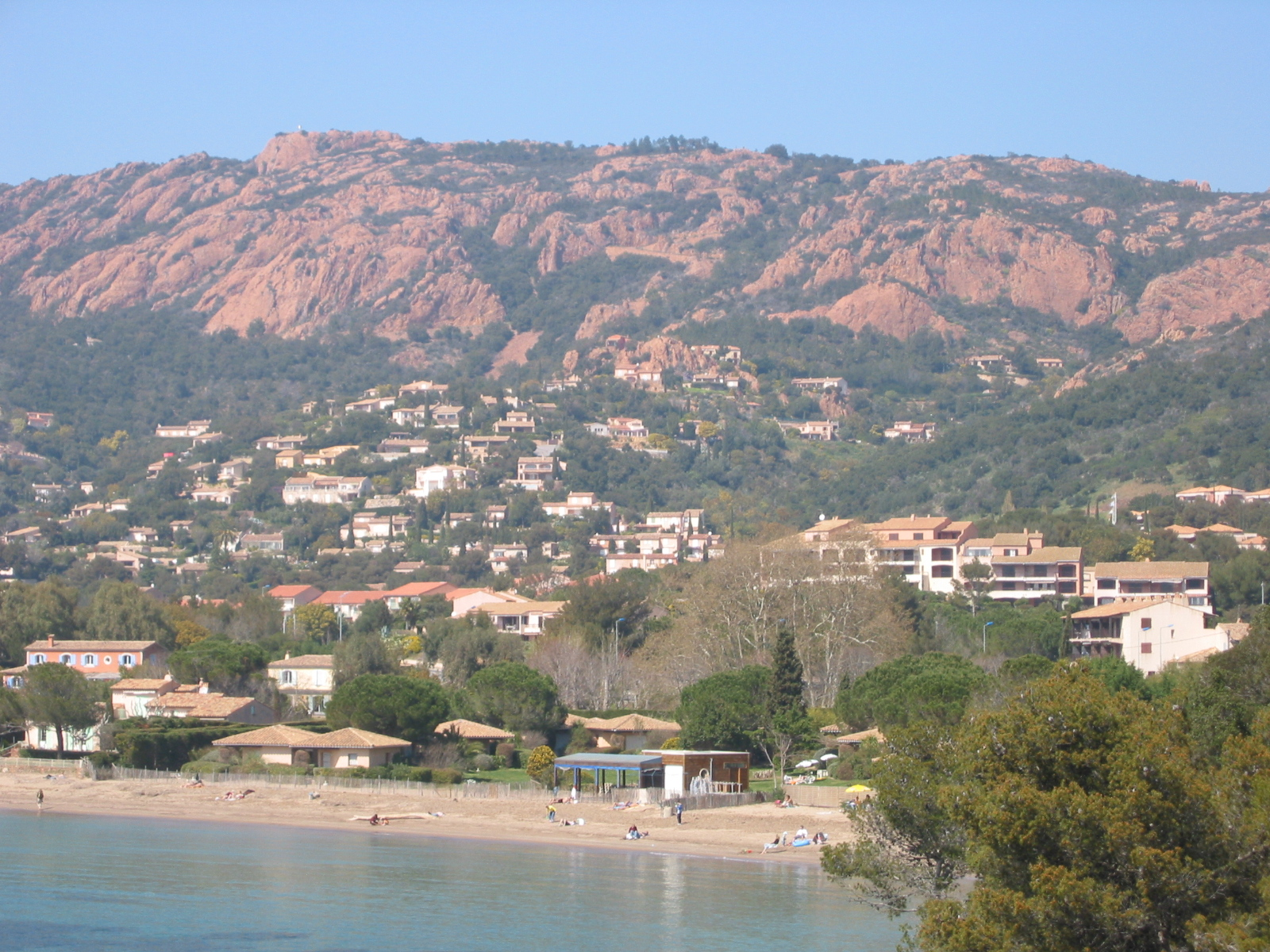
Zoom on the Rastel and its red rocks

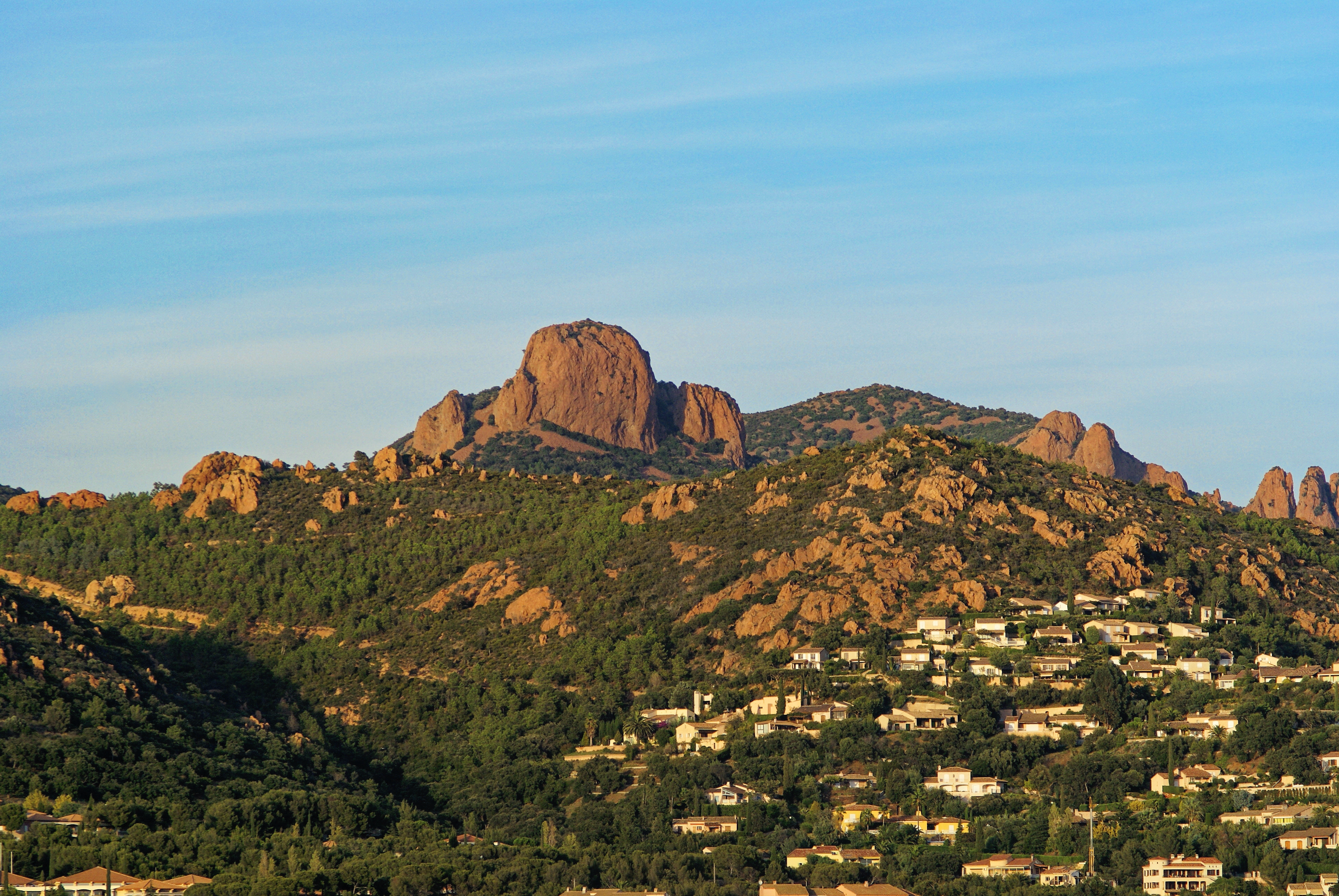
The Saint-Pilon rock as seen from Agay.

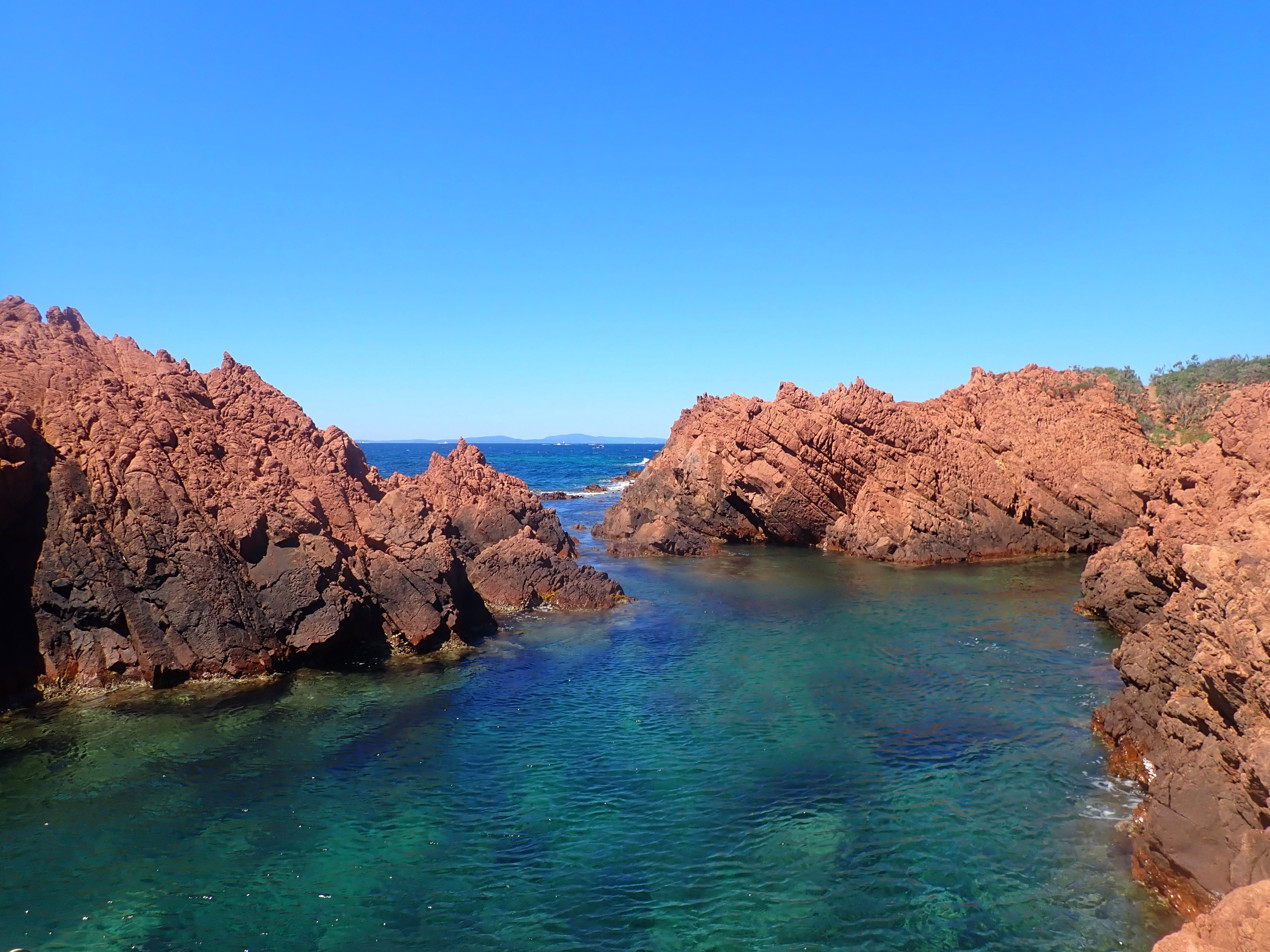
The whole Massif de l'Esterel is known for its bright red rocks.

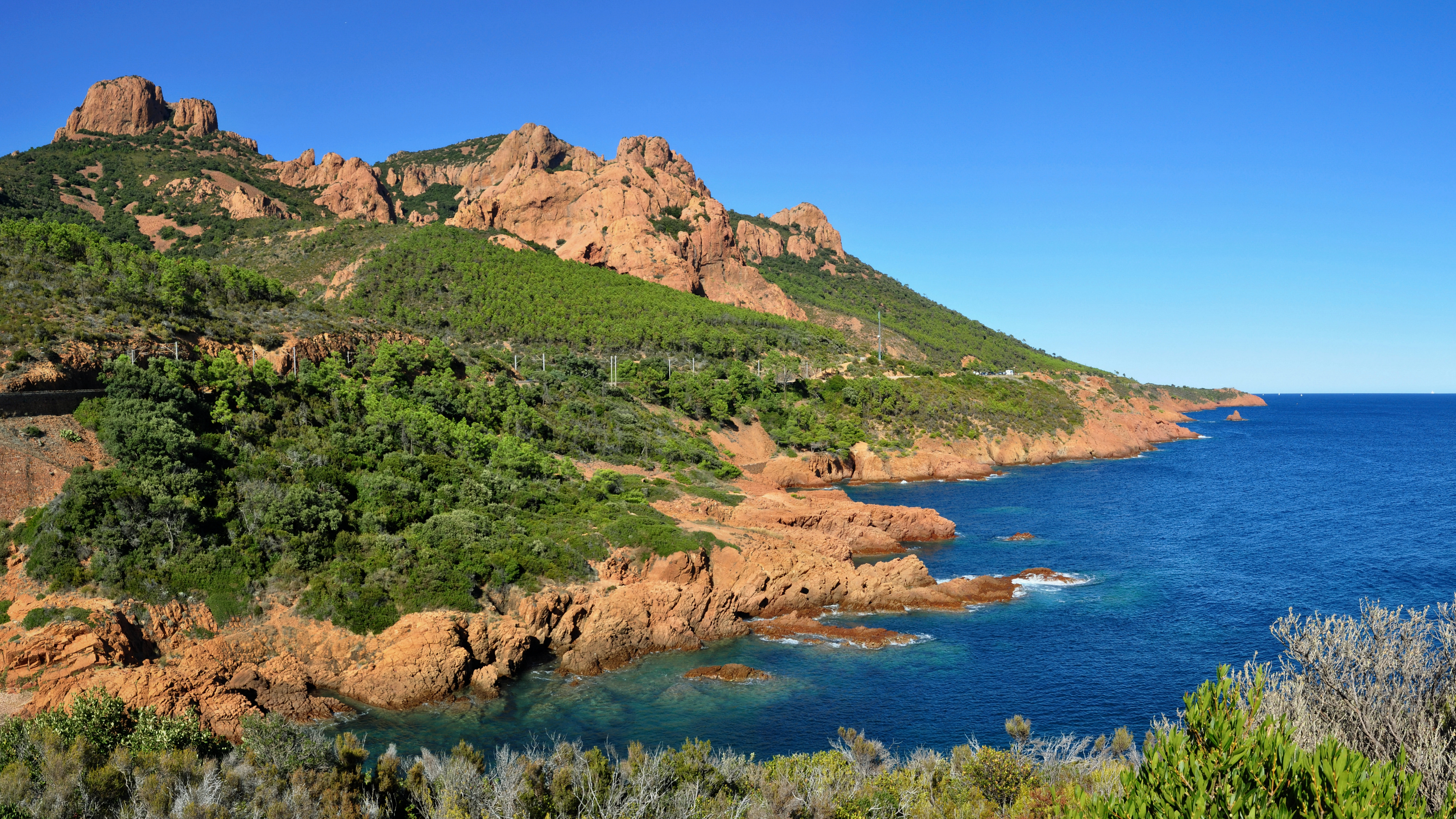
The famous Corniche d'Or road starts from Agay.

== History ==
The roots of Agay are said to go back to a harbour of the Oxybinians, a Celtic-Ligurian tribe. The harbour called Agathon 'good' offered the Greeks of Massilia protection and trading opportunities. Around 57 BC, the Romans founded a harbour (Portus Agathonis). In the 10th century, the Count of Provence, William the Liberator, donated Agay to Bishop Riculphe of Fréjus. In 1235, Agay, which was no longer inhabited due to the numerous Saracen raids, passed to Raymond Beranger IV.

Under Cardinal Richelieu, the place called Agay from this time onwards was equipped with fortifications, including two towers. One at the Baumette, the location of today's lighthouse, and the other at Le Dramont. After the Revolution, the garrisons stationed in the castle there were withdrawn and Agay was incorporated into Saint-Raphaël.

The 19th century saw the arrival of a customs post, a lighthouse and, above all, the railway line in 1864. This paved the way for porphyry quarrying at Dramont, and soon for the development of tourism.

It was in the 1880s that Saint-Raphaël became a popular destination for aristocratic tourists, thanks to the arrival of the train in 1863, which enabled the construction of the basilica and a number of luxury buildings, initially confined to the main town before expanding towards Boulouris (where the ‘Moorish Villa’ was built in 1881). Hotels and sumptuous villas in the Belle Époque and Art Nouveau styles were built in Agay as well as in Anthéor, le Dramont and Boulouris, boosting the activity of architects such as Pierre Aublé: long before the sea bathing craze, Agay was already attracting wealthy tourists from all over France to admire its exceptional setting and ideal climate.

At the turn of the 19th and 20th centuries, the intensity of the primary colours that dominate the landscape (red, green, blue) attracted painters, particularly a group of post-impressionists who from 1905 onwards went on to form the Fauvist movement.

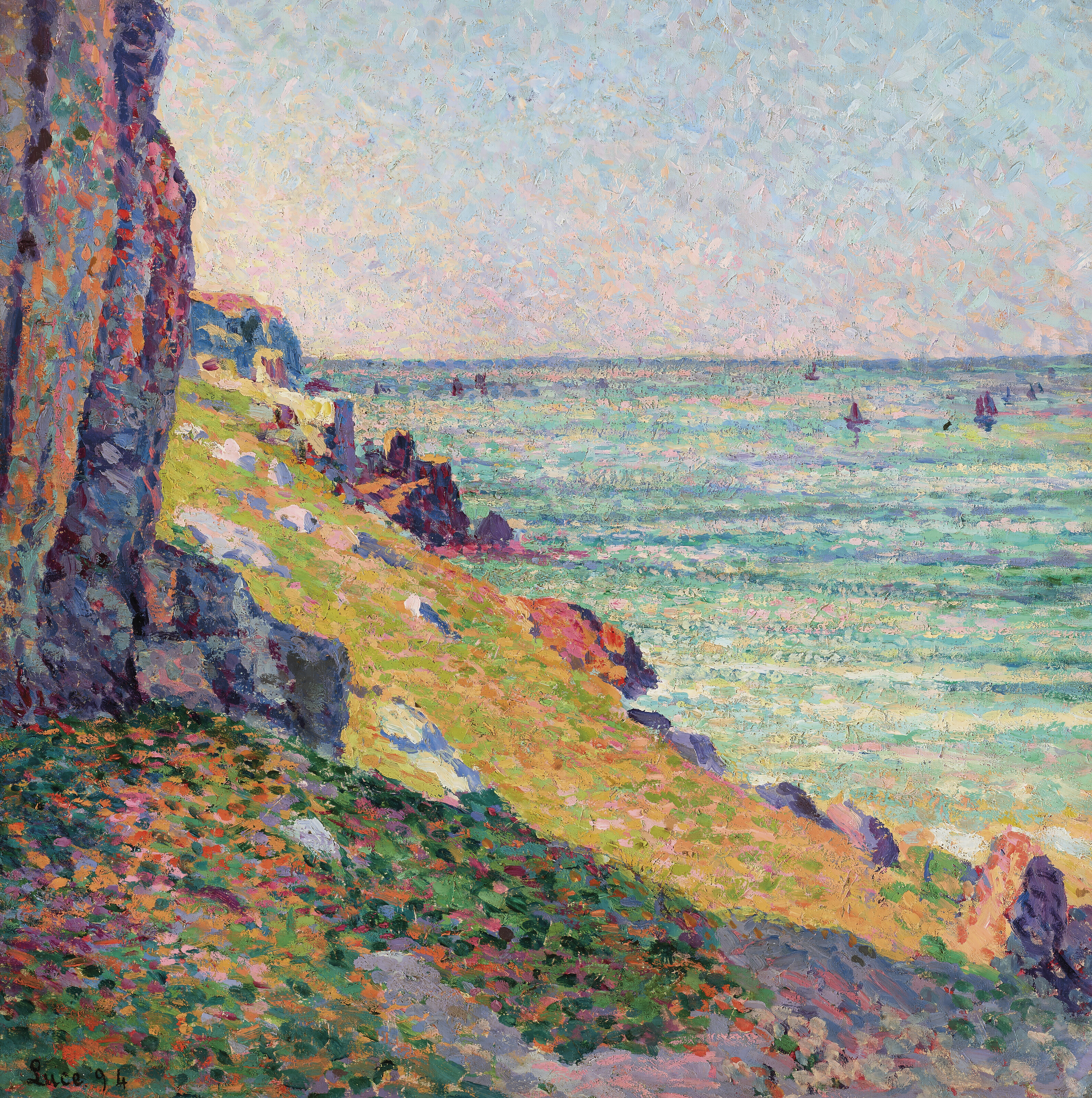
Les rochers à Agay, Maximilien Luce (1894).

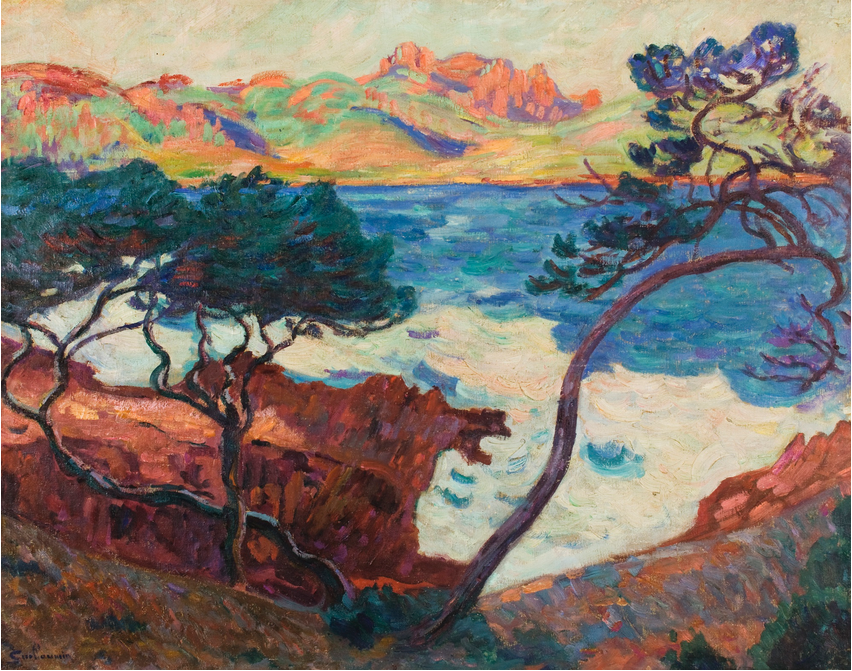
Agay, Armand Guillaumin (1899).

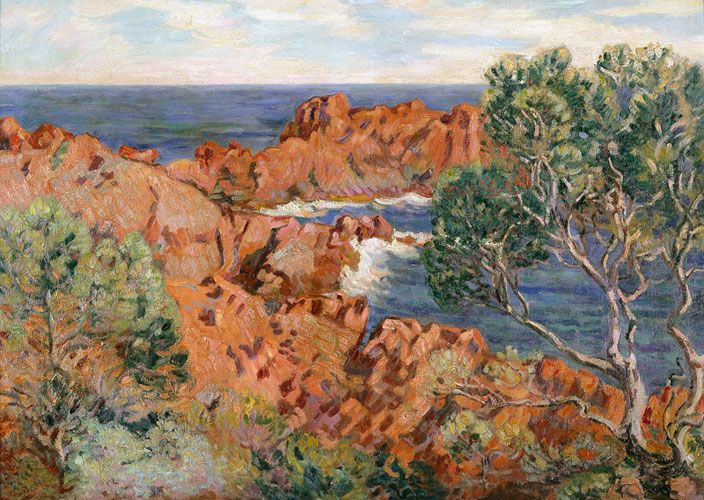
Agay Esterel, Armand Guillaumin (1901).

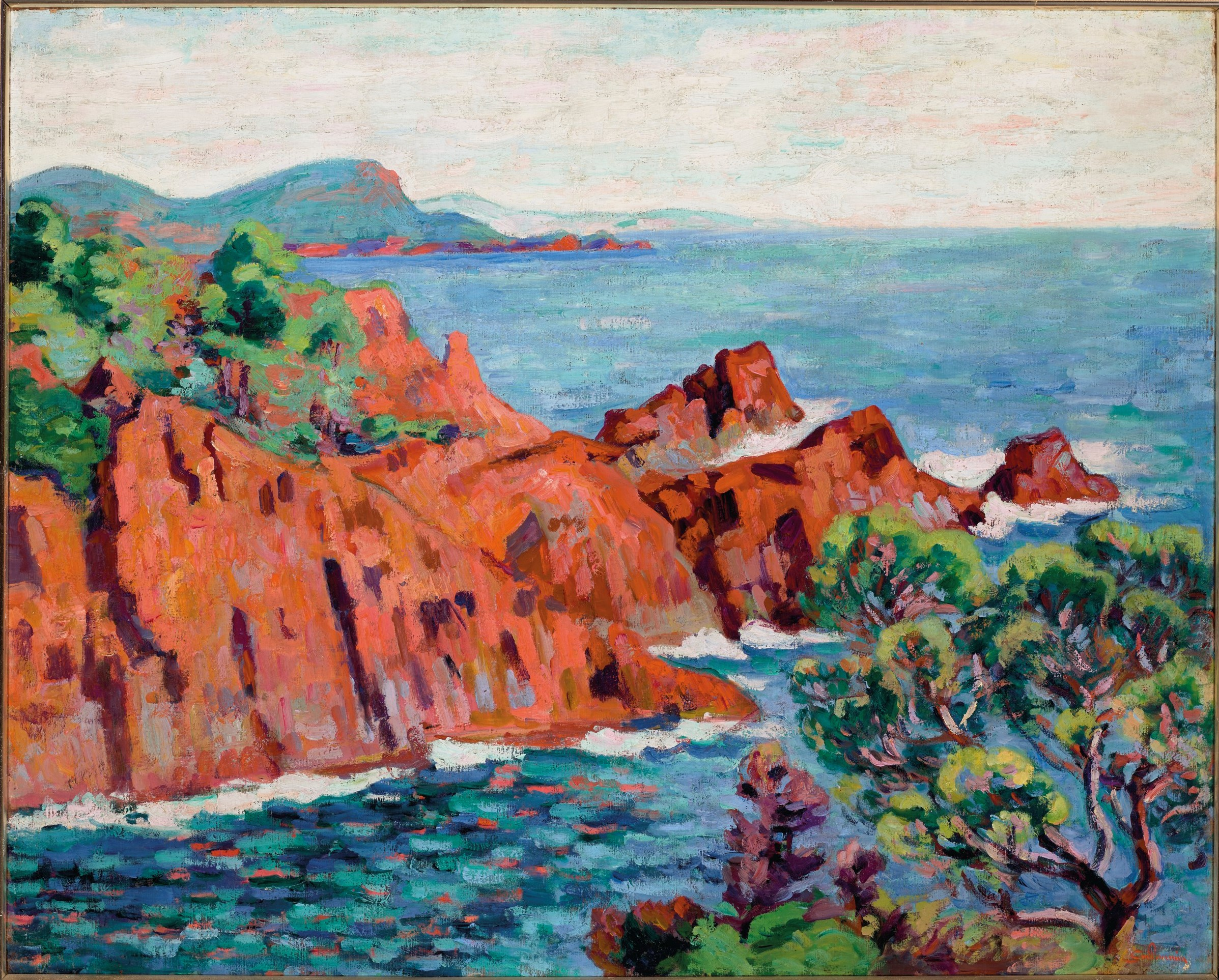
Les roches rouges à Agay, Armand Guillaumin (1912).

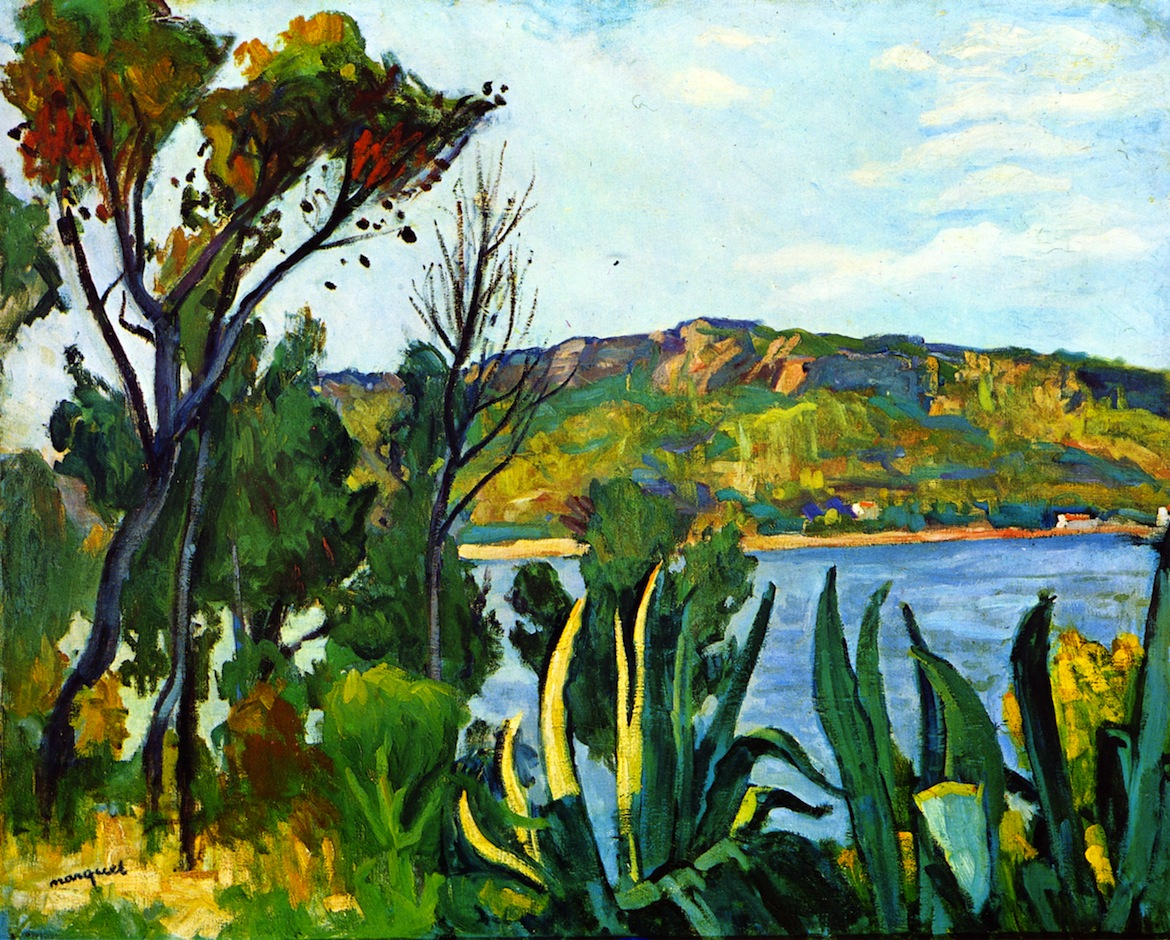
Paysage, baie méditerranéenne, vue d'Agay, Marquet (ca 1905).

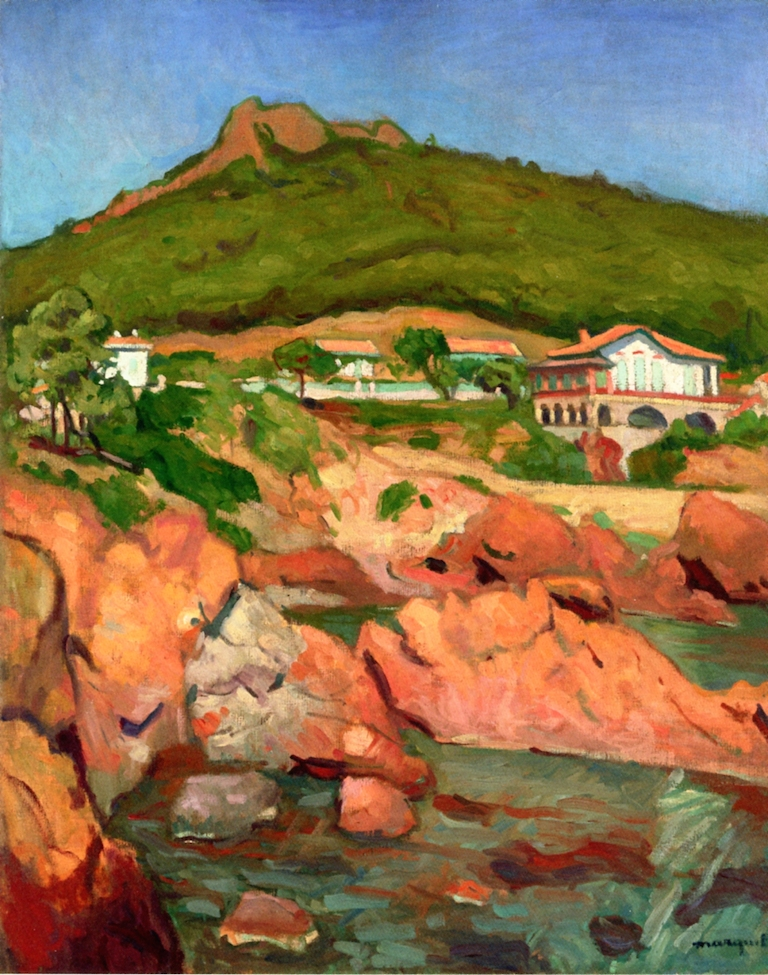
Vue d'Agay, les roches rouges, Marquet (1905).

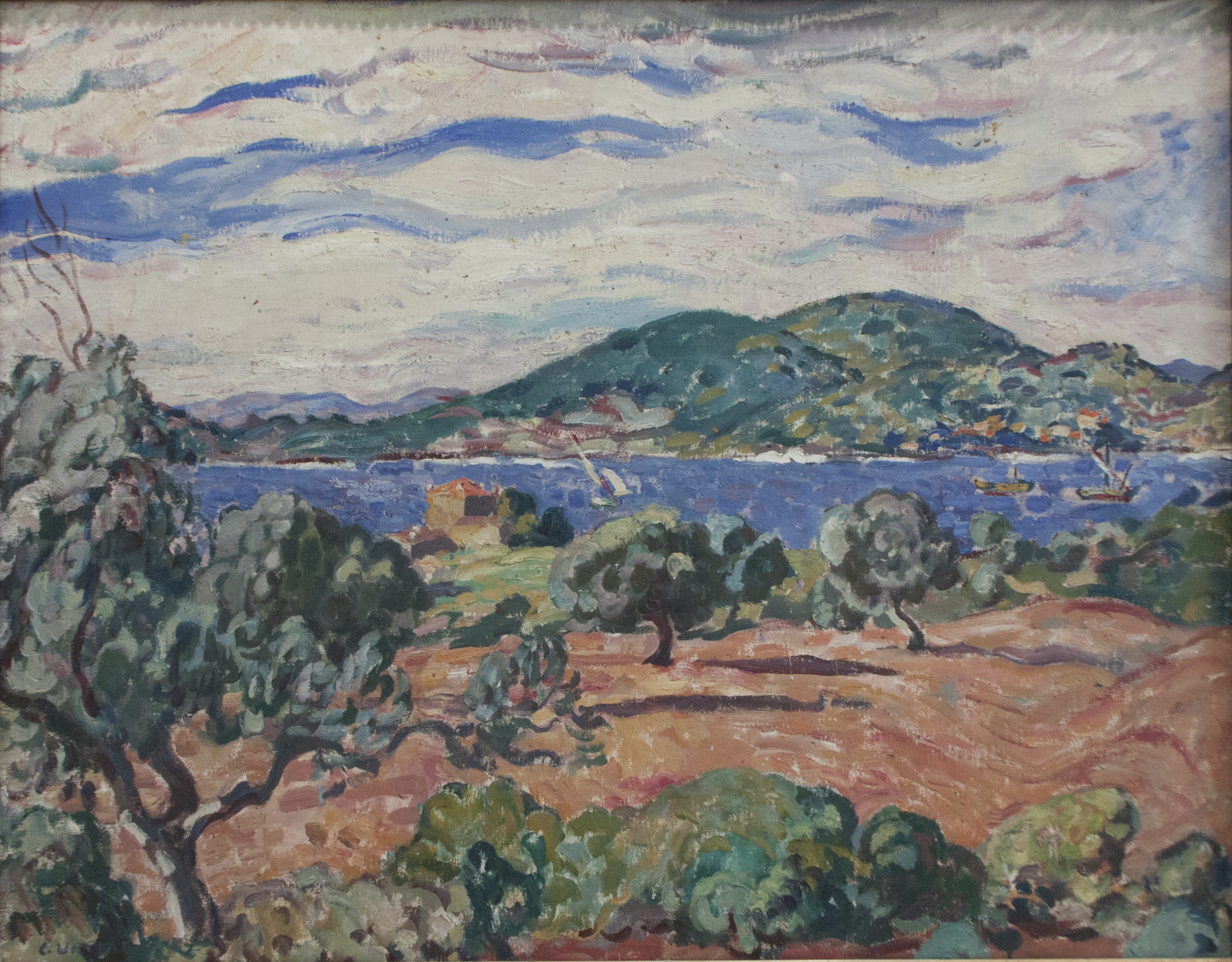
Baie d'Anthéor (actually Agay seen from Anthéor), Louis Valtat (ca 1907)

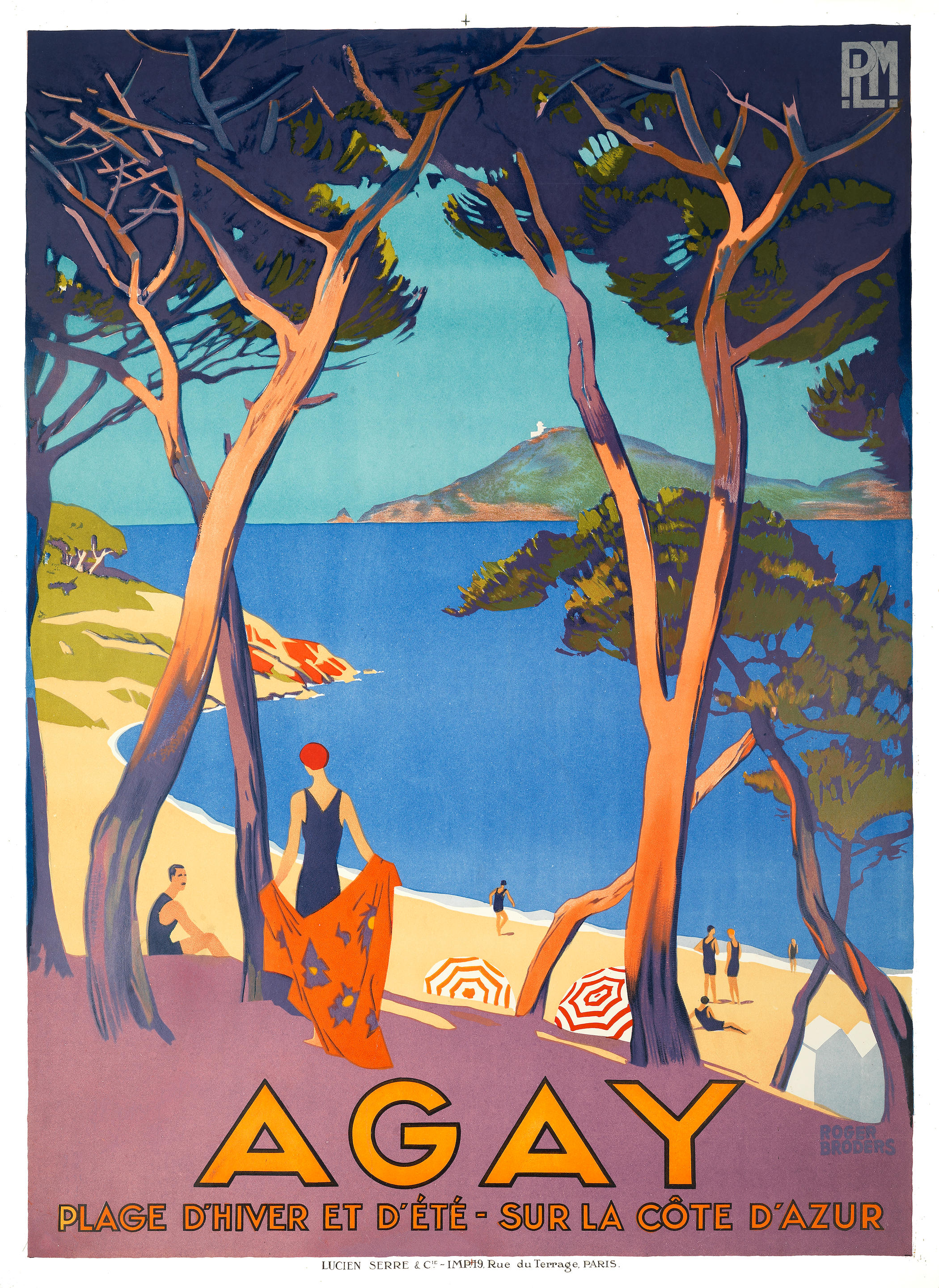
Advertising poster from 1928.

Summer tourism made its debut in the inter-war years with the opening of the Hôtel de la Baumette, a luxurious Art Nouveau building dominating the eastern tip of the town, and rapidly becoming a favourite with artists, intellectuals, aristocrats and other stars.

Famous people have stayed in Agay, including Gaston Doumergue, Guy de Maupassant and Antoine de Saint-Exupéry, who married Consuelo Suncin de Sandoval at Château d'Agay in 1932, in the home of his friend and brother-in-law Pierre d'Agay. Novelist Albert Cohen also set much of the plot of his famous novel Belle du Seigneur in Agay.

During the Second World War, the Germans destroyed the castle and burnt the countryside around the Estérel. The Anthéor viaduct was targeted and most of the houses and the chapel were destroyed.

Agay emerged from the Second World War largely destroyed (particularly the castle, both by the Germans and by the bombing raids at the end of 1943 in preparation for the Provence landings) and largely disfigured by numerous bunkers (some of which are still visible). Reconstruction was rapid, however, benefiting from the boom in the entire region of the French Riviera.

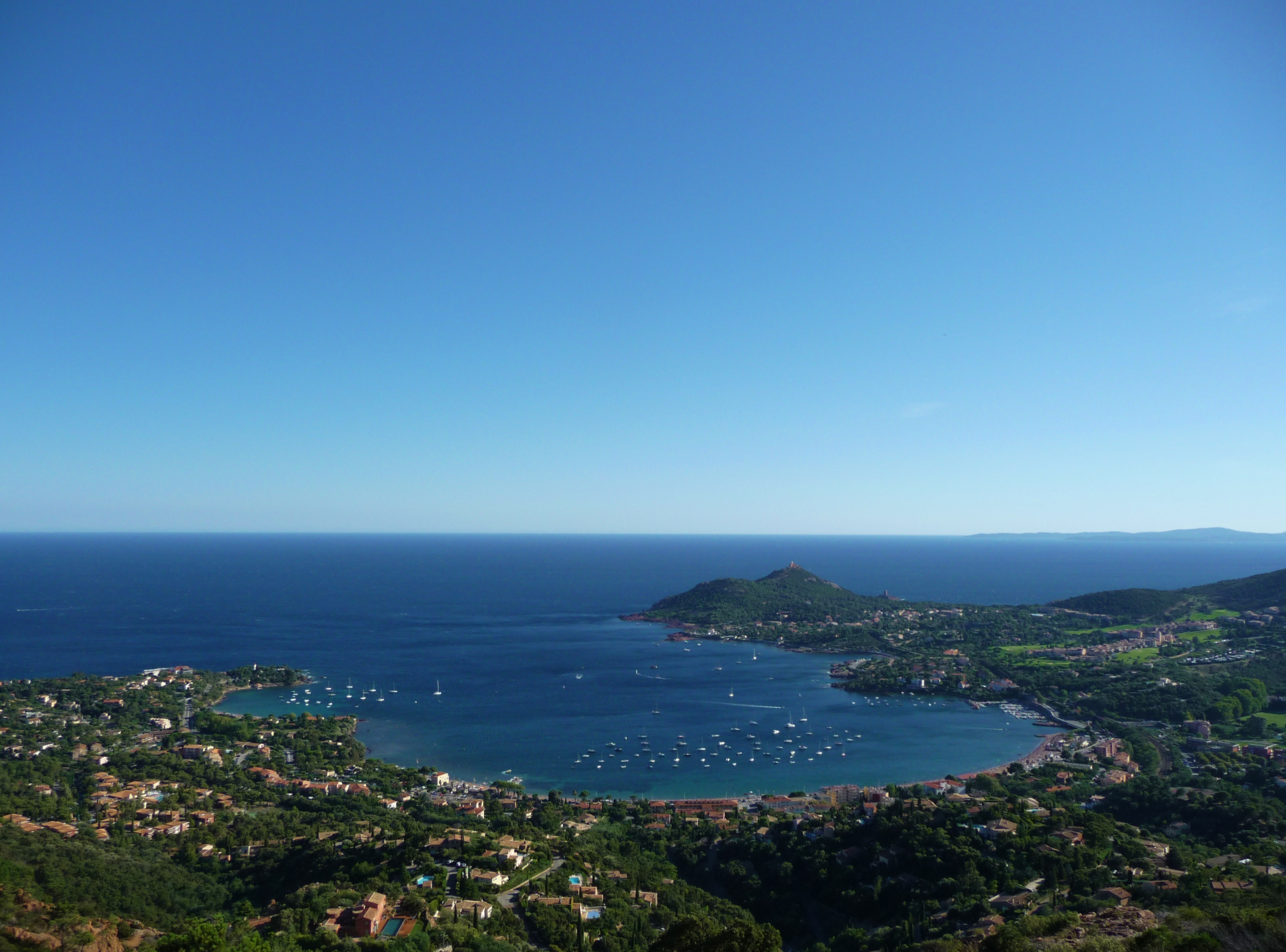
A contemporary view of Agay, seen from the Rastel mountain.

From the 1960s onwards, Agay followed the general trend of the Côte d'Azur and went from being a winter resort for the aristocracy to a summer seaside resort for the middle classes. A large number of holiday homes were built here, even though Agay, a listed site where building is strictly regulated, was spared the large concrete developments that have disfigured much of the coast. This has also enabled the bay to retain some control over its summer population, and therefore its quality of life.

In 1990, following a timely fire, the Pierre & Vacances group bought 210 hectares38 of previously undevelopable land in the western part of the bay to build its largest holiday village, called ‘Cap Esterel’, with 1,694 homes and a capacity of 8,000 holidaymakers.

At the same time, a large number of luxury villas were gradually taking over the lower hills of the bay, some in private developments.

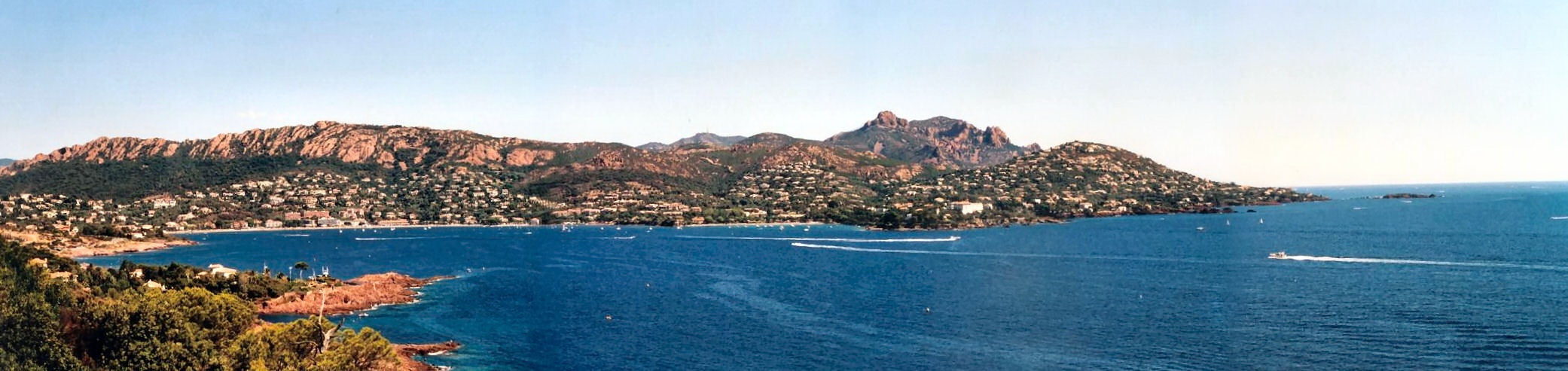
Panoramic view of the bay.
