= Napoleon Township =

Napoleon Township may refer to the following places in the United States:

- Napoleon Township, Michigan
- Napoleon Township, Henry County, Ohio
