= Charles Bonaparte =

Charles Bonaparte may refer to:

- Carlo Buonaparte (1746–1785), Corsican attorney, father of Napoleon I of France
- Charles Lucien Bonaparte (1803–1857), Prince Canino, French naturalist and ornithologist
- Charles Joseph Bonaparte (1851–1921), United States Attorney General
- Charles, Prince Napoléon (born 1950), pretender to the Imperial Throne of France
- Charles Bonaparte, a character in the manga series Freezing
