= Morlunda =

Morlunda may refer to:

- Mörlunda, is a locality situated in Hultsfred Municipality, Kalmar County, Sweden
- Morlunda (Greenbrier County, West Virginia), listed on the National Register of Historic Places in Greenbrier County, West Virginia
- Morlunda, West Virginia, an unincorporated community
