= Diorite =

Igneous rock type

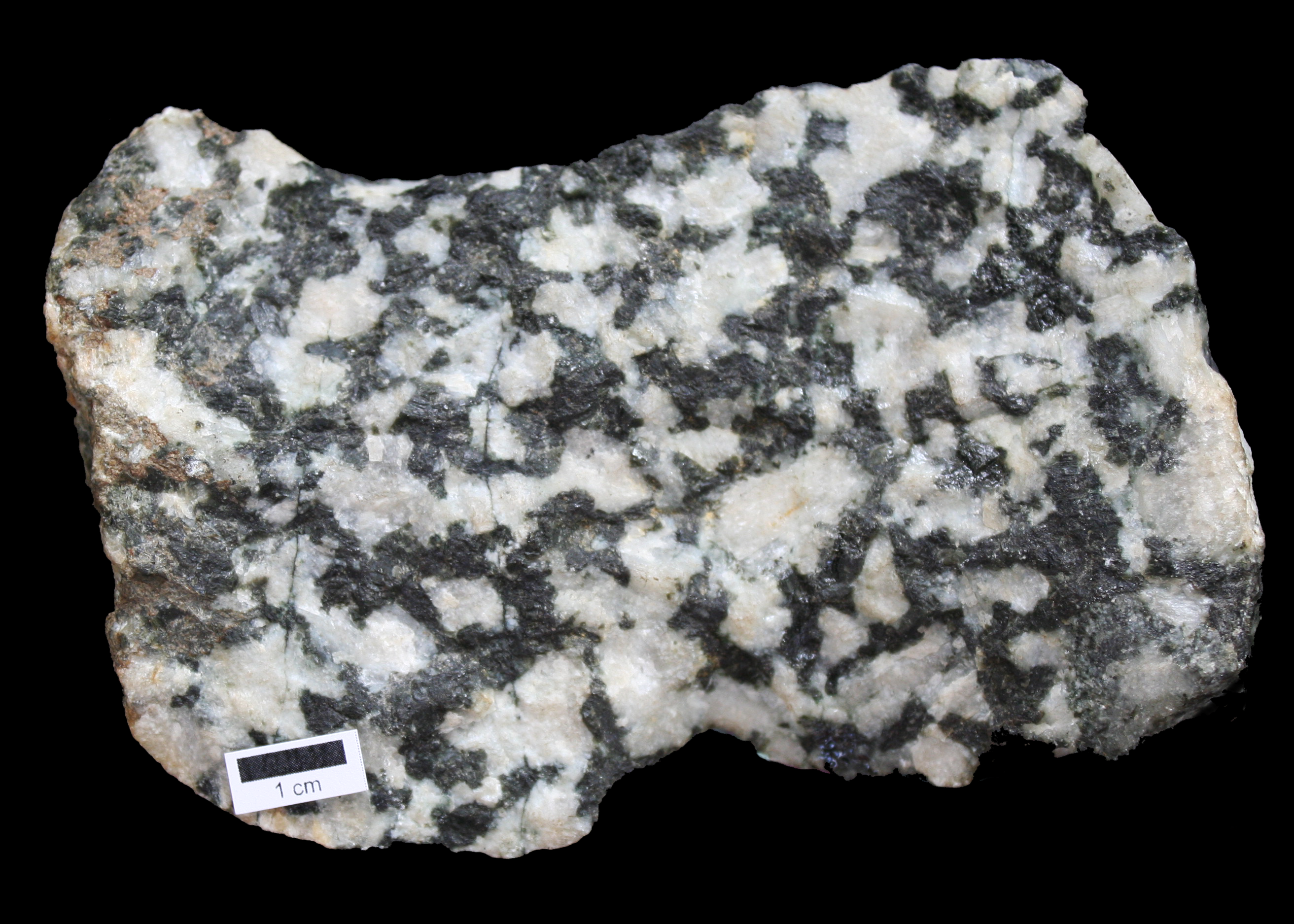
Diorite

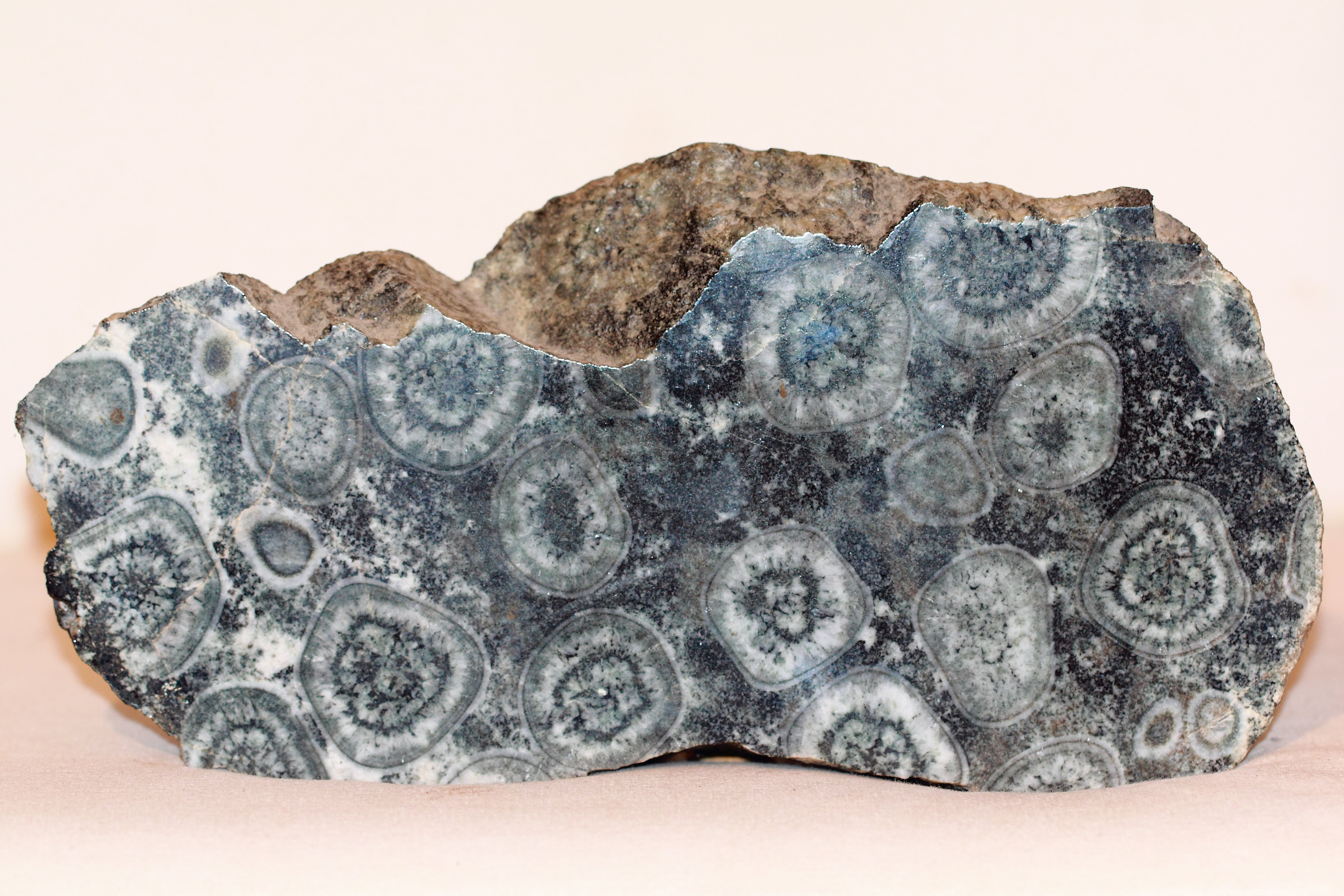
Orbicular diorite from Corsica (corsite)

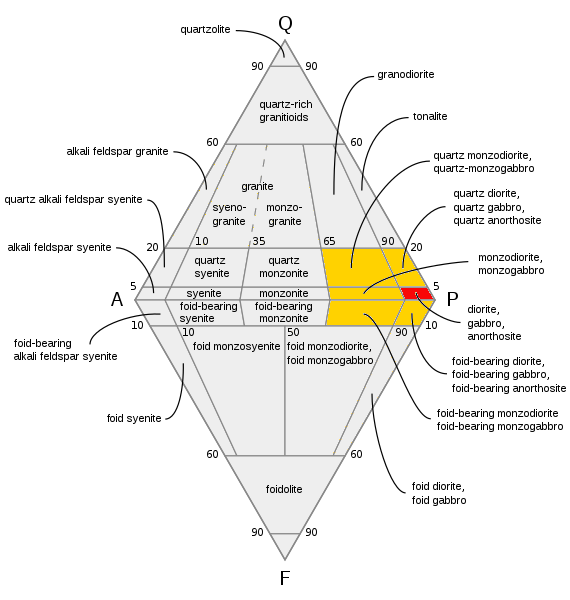
QAPF diagram with dioritoid fields highlighted in yellow and diorite in red

Mineral assemblage of igneous rocks

Diorite (/ˈdaɪ.əraɪt/ DY-ə-ryte) is an intrusive igneous rock formed by the slow cooling underground of magma (molten rock) that has a moderate content of silica and a relatively low content of alkali metals. It is intermediate in composition between low-silica (mafic) gabbro and high-silica (felsic) granite.

Diorite is found in mountain-building belts (orogens) on the margins of continents. It has the same composition as the fine-grained volcanic rock, andesite, which is also common in orogens.

Diorite has been used since prehistoric times as decorative stone. It was used by the Akkadian Empire of Sargon of Akkad for funerary sculptures, and by many later civilizations for sculptures and building stone.

== Description ==
Diorite is an intrusive igneous rock composed principally of the silicate minerals plagioclase feldspar (typically andesine), biotite, hornblende, and sometimes pyroxene. The chemical composition of diorite is intermediate, between that of mafic gabbro and felsic granite. It is distinguished from gabbro on the basis of the composition of the plagioclase species; the plagioclase in diorite is richer in sodium and poorer in calcium.

Geologists use rigorous quantitative definitions to classify coarse-grained igneous rocks, based on the mineral content of the rock. For igneous rocks composed mostly of silicate minerals, and in which at least 10% of the mineral content consists of quartz, feldspar, or feldspathoid minerals, classification begins with the QAPF diagram. The relative abundances of quartz (Q), alkali feldspar (A), plagioclase (P), and feldspathoid (F), are used to plot the position of the rock on the diagram. The rock will be classified as either a dioritoid or a gabbroid if quartz makes up less than 20% of the QAPF content, feldspathoid makes up less than 10% of the QAPF content, and plagioclase makes up more than 65% of the total feldspar content. Dioritoids are distinguished from gabbroids by an anorthite (calcium plagioclase) fraction of their total plagioclase of less than 50%.

The composition of the plagioclase cannot easily be determined in the field, and then a preliminary distinction is made between dioritoid and gabbroid based on the content of mafic minerals. A dioritoid typically has less than 35% mafic minerals, typically including hornblende, while a gabbroid typically has over 35% mafic minerals, mostly pyroxenes or olivine. The name diorite (from Ancient Greek διορίζειν, "to distinguish") was first applied to the rock by René Just Haüy on account of its characteristic, easily identifiable large crystals of hornblende.

Dioritoids form a family of rock types similar to diorite, such as monzodiorite, quartz diorite, or nepheline-bearing diorite. Diorite itself is more narrowly defined, as a dioritoid in which quartz makes up less than 5% of the QAPF content, feldspathoids are not present, and plagioclase makes up more than 90% of the feldspar content.

Diorite may contain small amounts of quartz, microcline, and olivine. Zircon, apatite, titanite, magnetite, ilmenite, and sulfides occur as accessory minerals. Varieties deficient in hornblende and other dark minerals are called leucodiorite. A ferrodiorite is a dioritoid enriched in iron and titanium. Ferrodiorites are common in the lower oceanic crust.

Coarse-grained (phaneritic) dioritoids are produced by slow crystallization of magma having the same composition as the lava that solidifies rapidly to form fine-grained (aphanitic) andesite. Rock of similar composition to diorite or andesite but with an intermediate texture is sometimes called microdiorite. Diorite is occasionally porphyritic. It usually contains enough mafic minerals to be dark in appearance. Orbicular diorite shows alternating concentric growth bands of plagioclase and amphibole surrounding a nucleus, within a diorite porphyry matrix.

== Occurrence ==
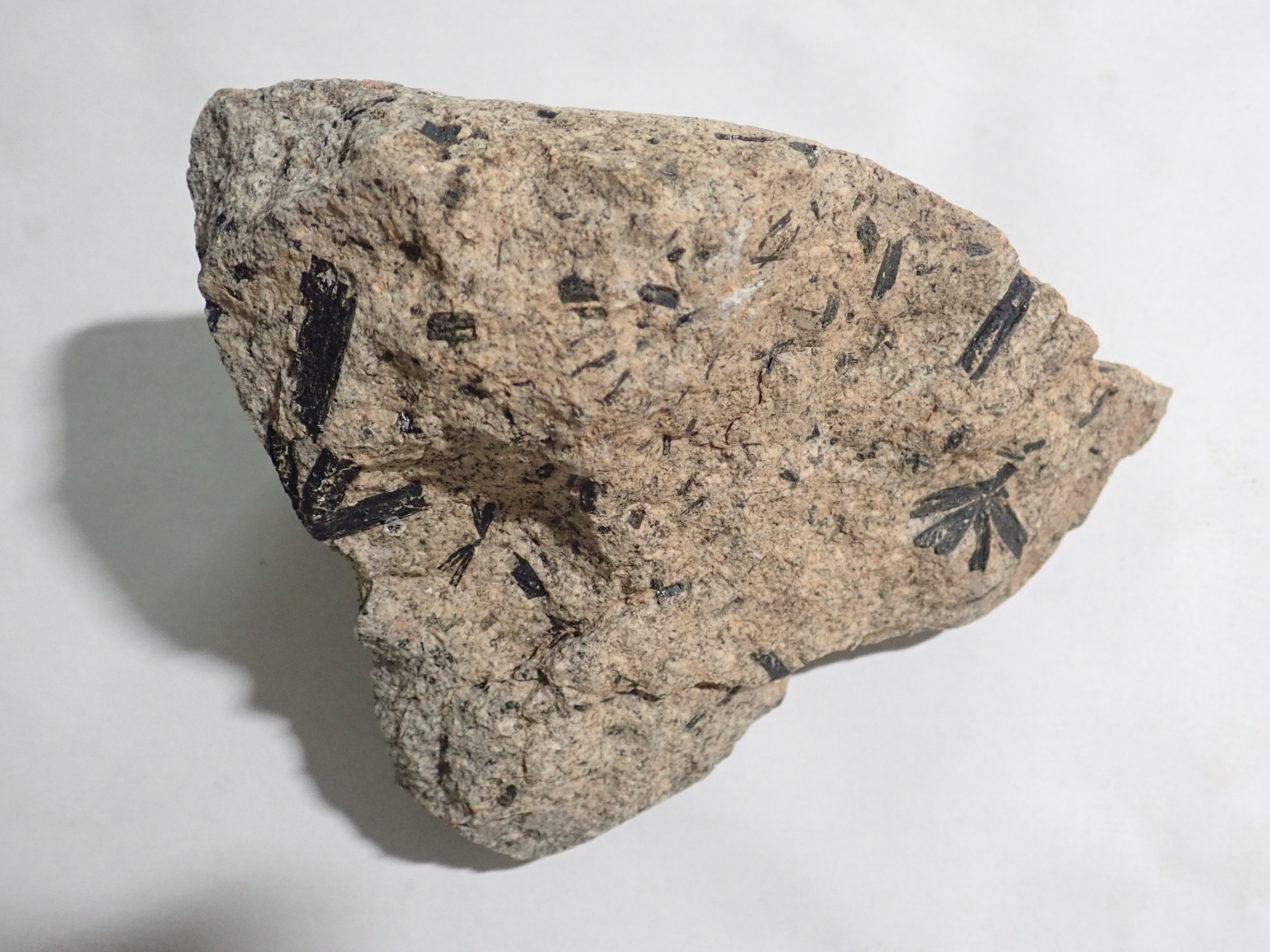
Hornblende diorite from the Henry Mountains, Utah, US

Diorite results from the partial melting of a mafic rock above a subduction zone. It is found in volcanic arcs, and in cordilleran mountain building, such as in the Andes Mountains. However, while its extrusive volcanic equivalent, andesite, is common in these settings, diorite is a minor component of the plutonic rocks, which are mostly granodiorite or granite. Diorite also makes up some stocks intruded beneath large calderas.

Diorite source localities include Leicestershire and Aberdeenshire, UK; Thuringia and Saxony in Germany; Finland; Romania; central Sweden; southern Vancouver Island around Victoria, Canada; the Darran Range of New Zealand; the Andes Mountains; and Concordia in South Africa. Hornblende diorite is a common rock type in the Henry, Abajo, and La Sal Mountains of Utah, US, where it was emplaced as laccoliths.

An orbicular variety found in Corsica was formerly called corsite. An obsolete name for microdiorite, markfieldite, was given by Frederick Henry Hatch in 1909 to exposures near the village of Markfield, England. Esterellite is a local name for microdiorite given by Auguste Michel-Lévy to exposures in the Esterel Massif in France.

== Use ==
Human use of diorite dates at least to the Middle Neolithic, when it was used in a passage grave at Le Dolmen du Mont Ubé, Jersey. The use of stone of contrasting colour suggests that diorite was deliberately selected for its appearance.

The first great Mesopotamian empire, the Akkadian Empire of Sargon of Akkad, began using diorite for sculpture after sources of the rock came under Akkadian control. Diorite was used to depict rulers or high officials in ceremonial poses or attitudes of prayer, and the sculptures may have been designed to receive funerary offerings. Diorite was also used for stone vases by Bronze Age craftspeople, who developed considerable skill at polishing diorite and other stones. The Egyptians had become skilled at shaping diorite and other hard stones by 4000 BCE. A large diorite stela in the Louvre Museum dating to 1700 BCE is inscribed with the Code of Hammurabi.

Diorite was used by the Inca civilization as structural stone. It was used by medieval Islamic builders to construct water fountains in the Crimea. In later times, diorite was commonly used as cobblestone; today many diorite cobblestone streets can be found in England and Guernsey. Guernsey diorite was used in the steps of St Paul's Cathedral, London.

Today, diorite is uncommon in construction, although it shares similar physical properties with granite. Diorite is often sold commercially as "black granite". Diorite's modern uses include construction aggregate, curbing, usage as dimension stones, cobblestone, and facing stones.

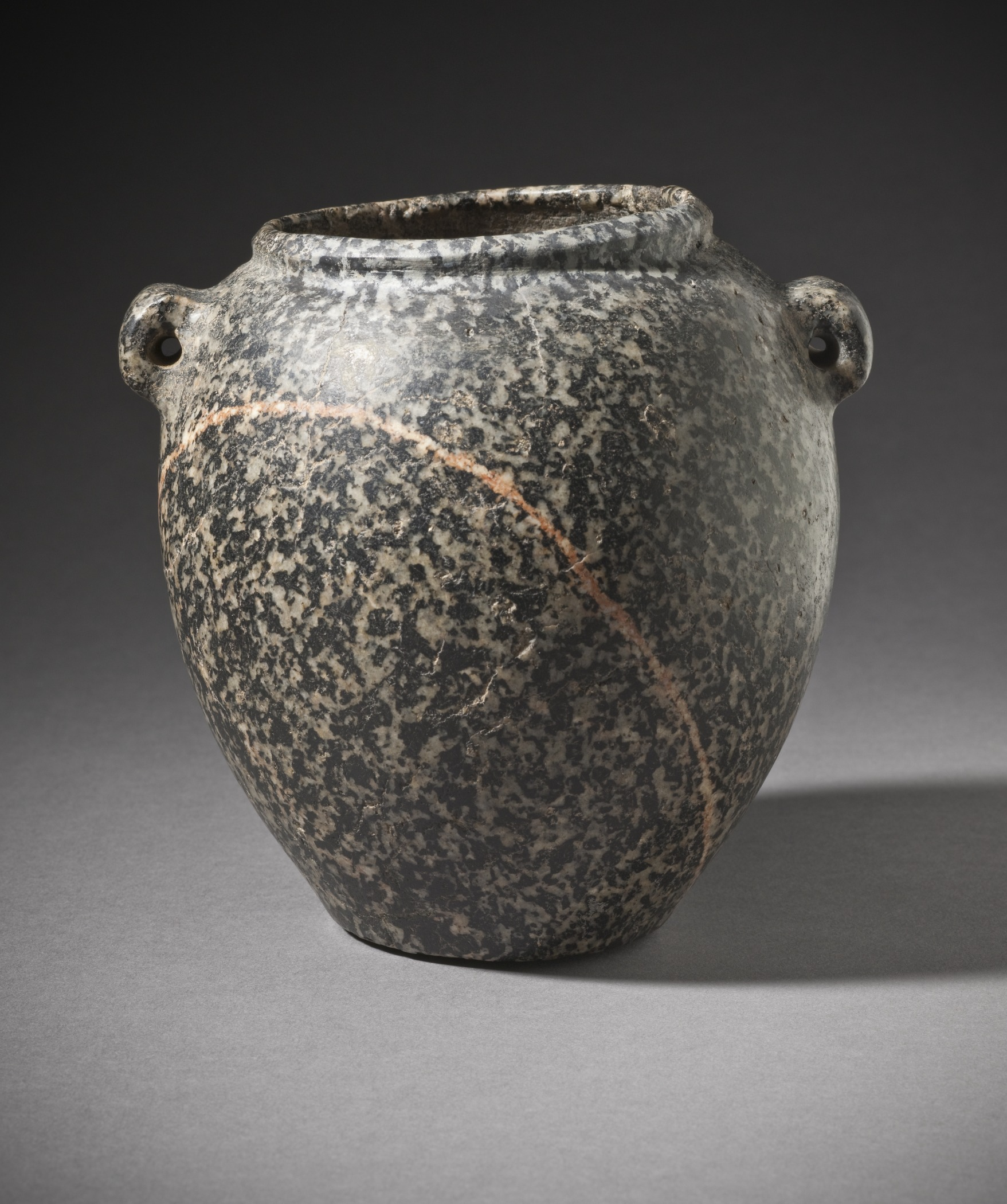
Naqada II jar with lug handles; c. 3500–3050 BC; height: 13 cm (5 in); Los Angeles County Museum of Art (US)

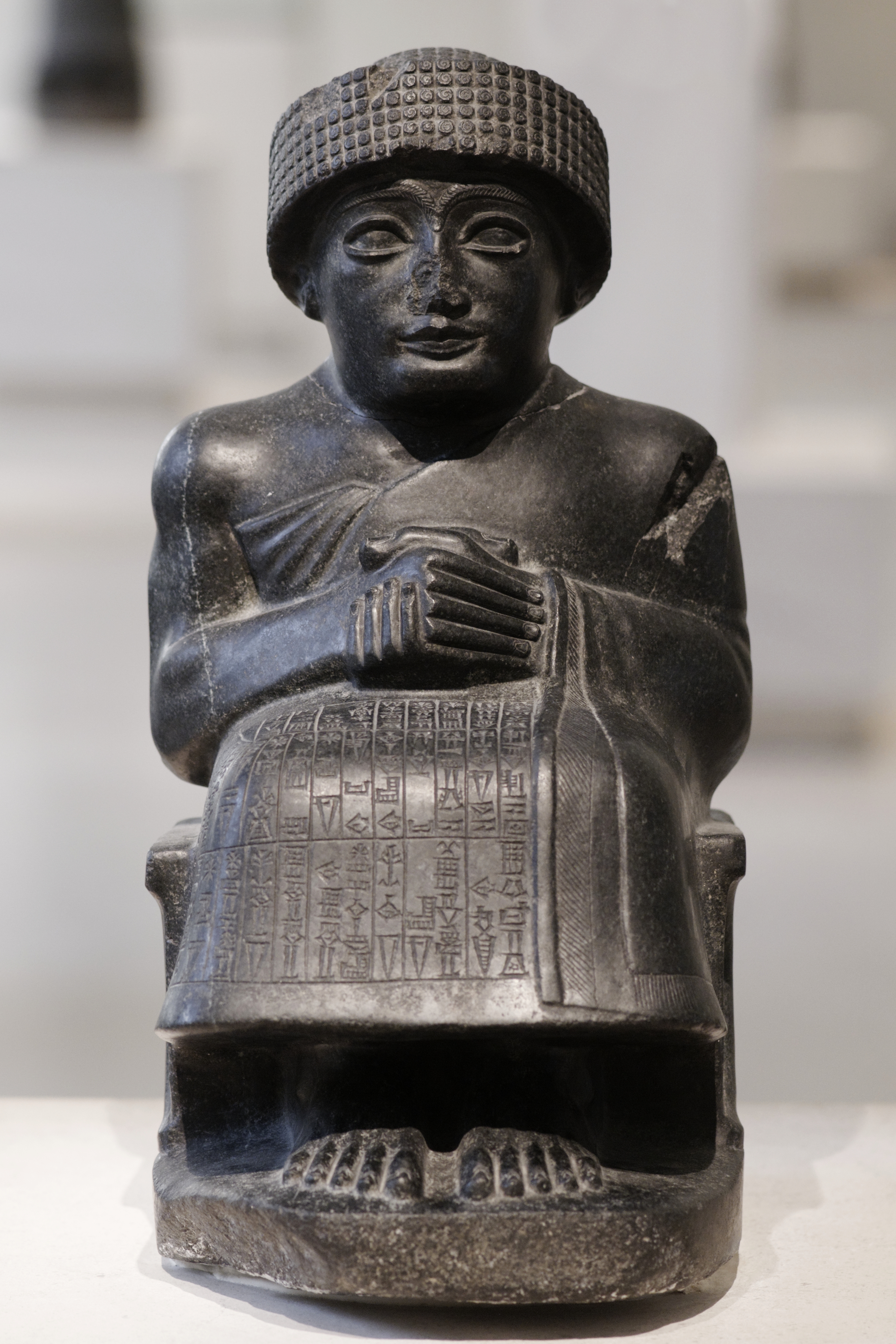
Statue of Gudea I, dedicated to the god Ningishzida; 2120 BC (the Neo-Sumerian period); height: 46 cm (20 in), width: 33 cm (10 in), depth: 22.5 cm (8.9 in); Louvre

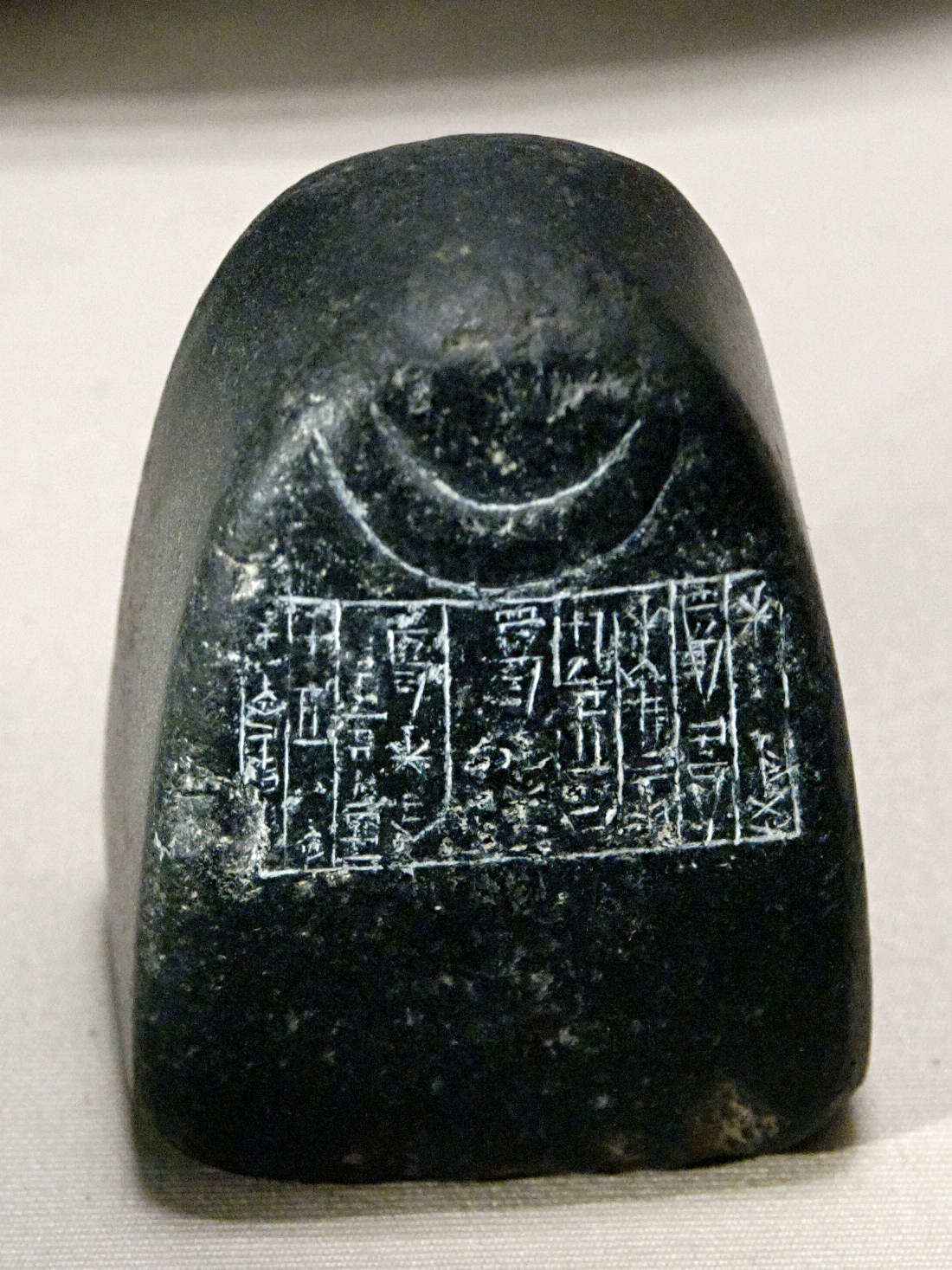
Weight dedicated by King Shulgi of Ur with a crescent moon on it; 2094-2047 BC; weight: 248 g; Louvre

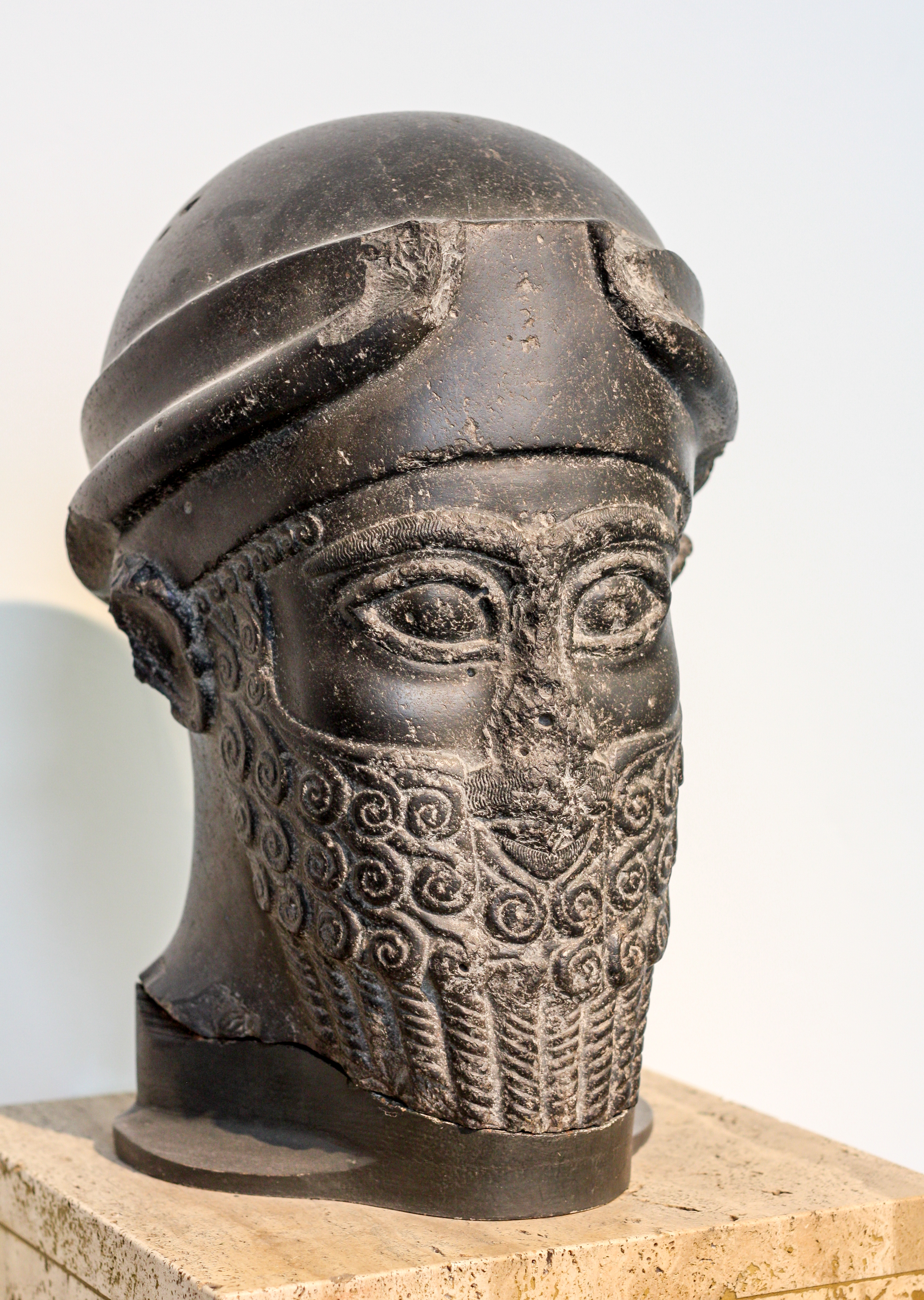
Assyrian head of a bearded god wearing a cap with horns dedicated by Puzur-Eshtar of Mari; middle Bronze Age; height: 37 cm (15 in); Vorderasiatisches Museum (Berlin, Germany)

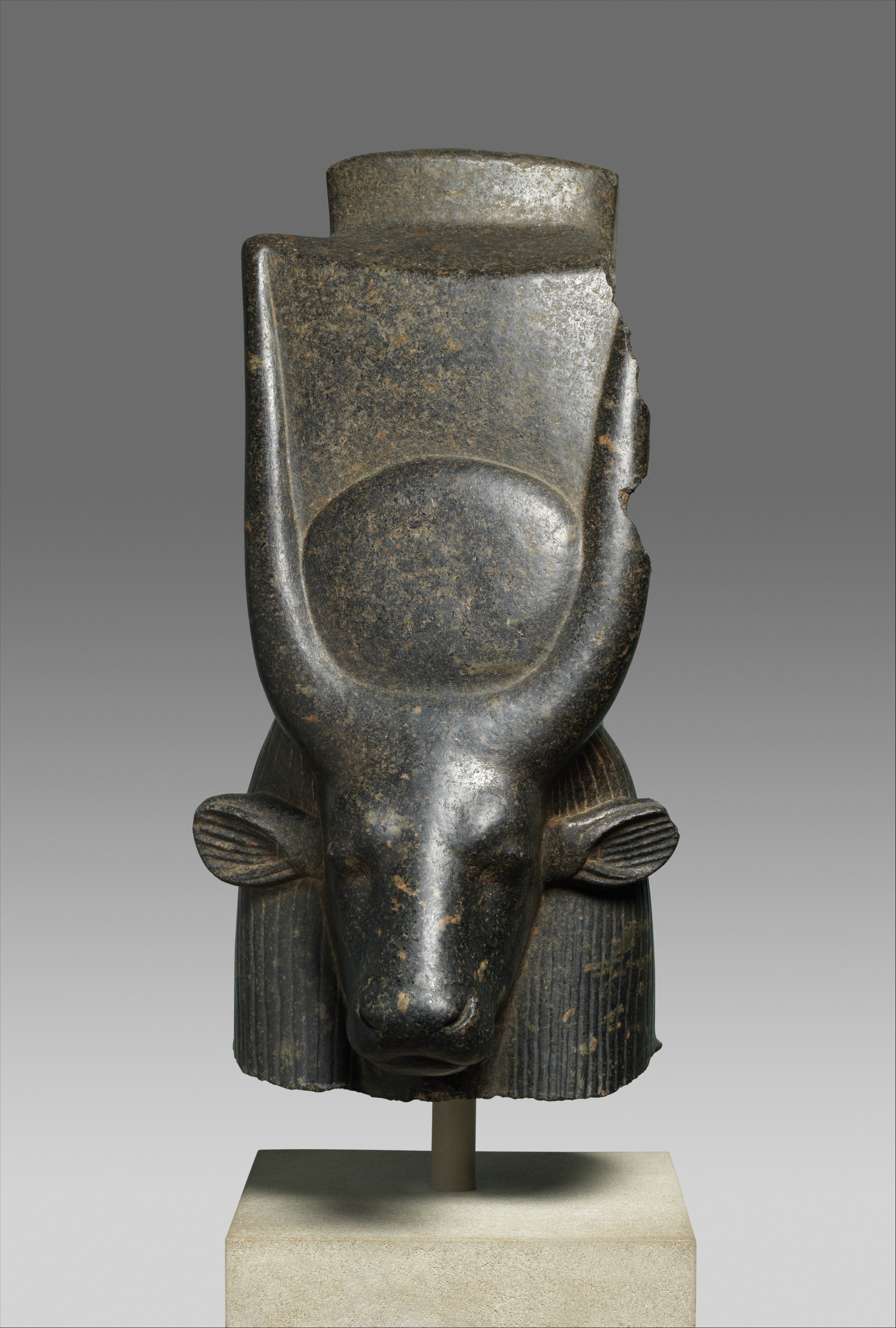
Head of a cow goddess (Hathor or Mehet-Weret); 1390-1352 BC; height: 53.6 cm (21.1 in), width: 28 cm (11 in), depth: 33 cm (13 in); Metropolitan Museum of Art (New York City)

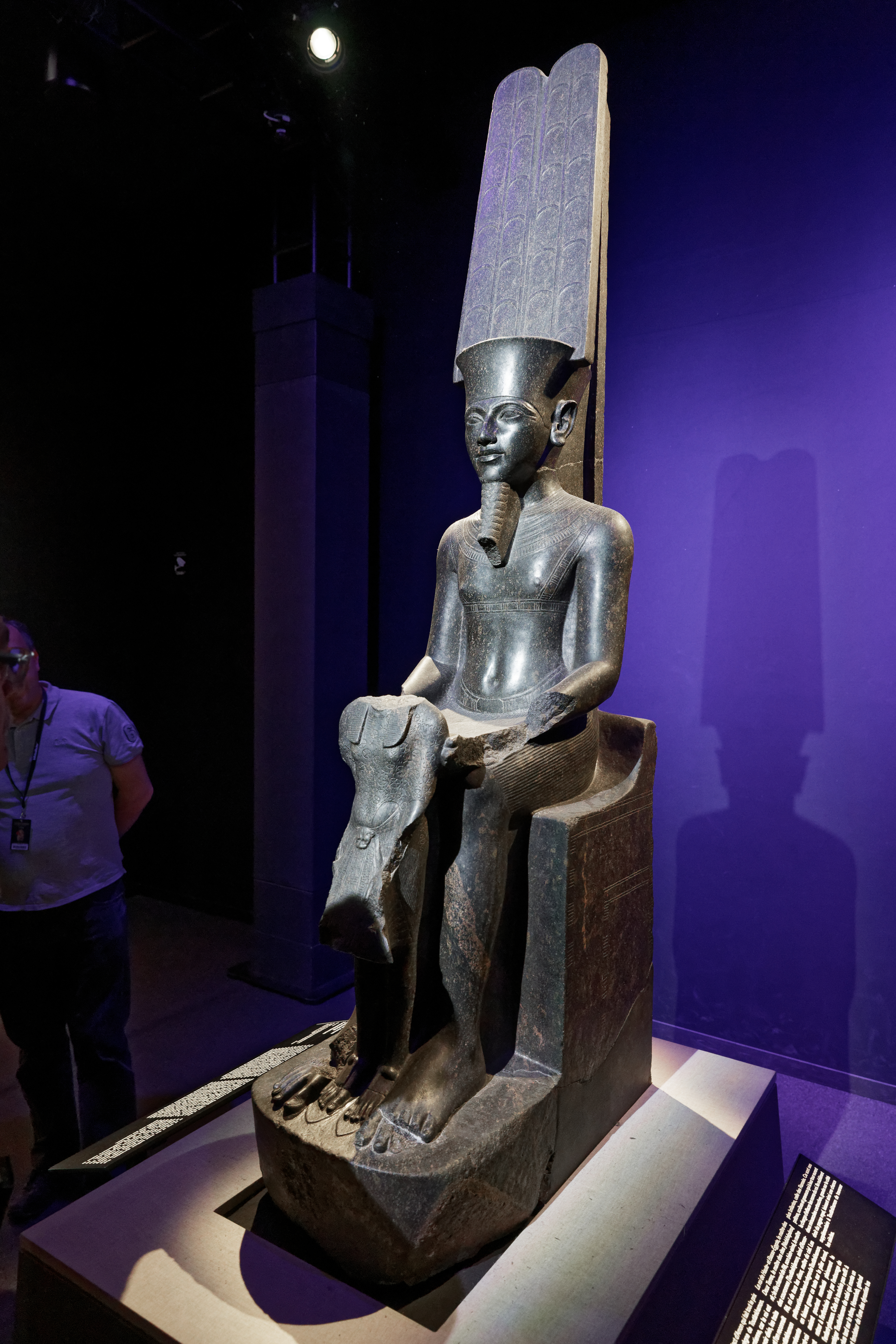
Statue of Amun; 1336-1327 BC; height: 220 cm (87 in), width: 44, length: 78 cm (31 in); Louvre

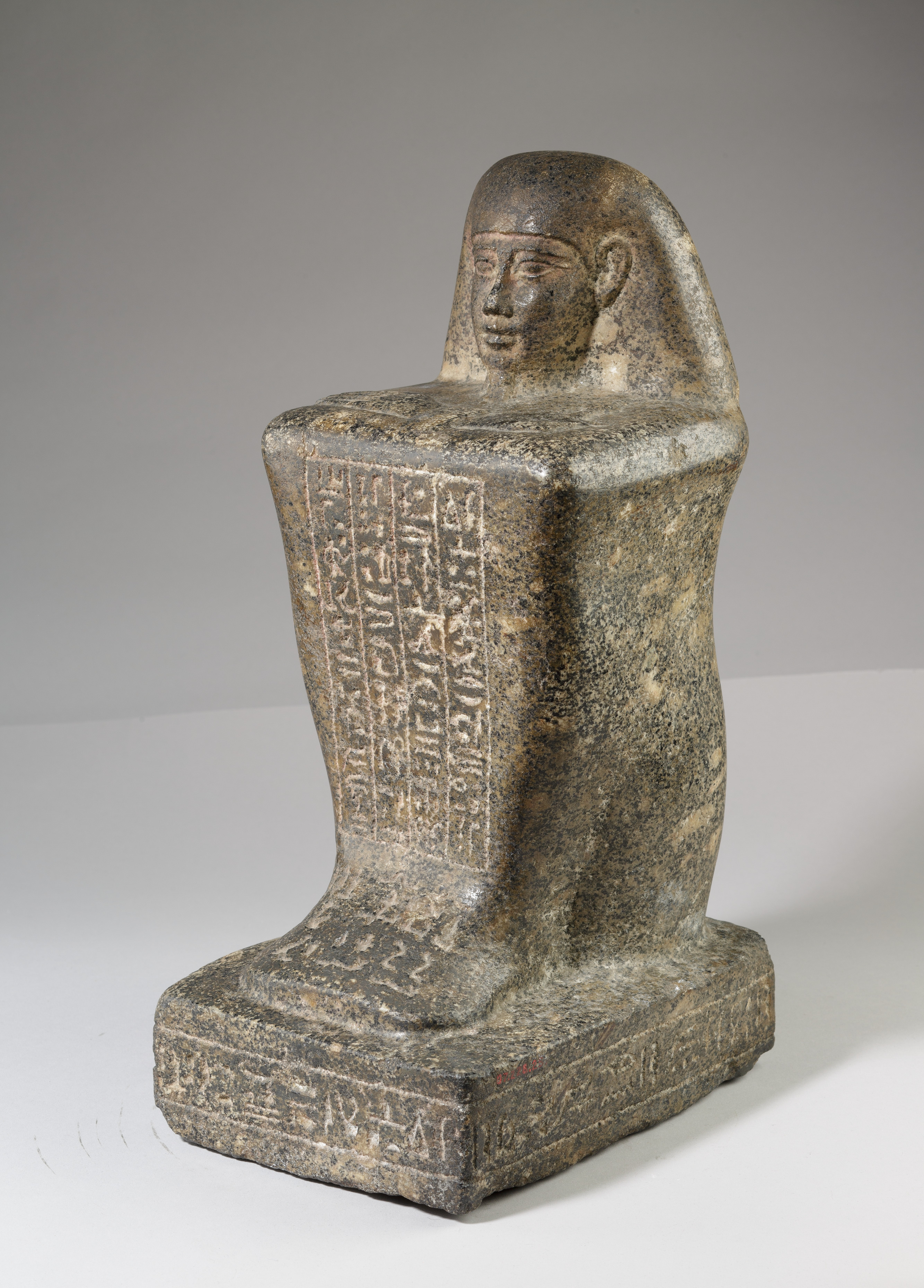
Block statue of the god's father Pameniuwedja, son of Nesmin and Nestefnut; 4th century BC; height: 34.6 cm (13.6 in), width: 14.5 cm (5.7 in), depth: 19.1 cm (7.5 in); Metropolitan Museum of Art

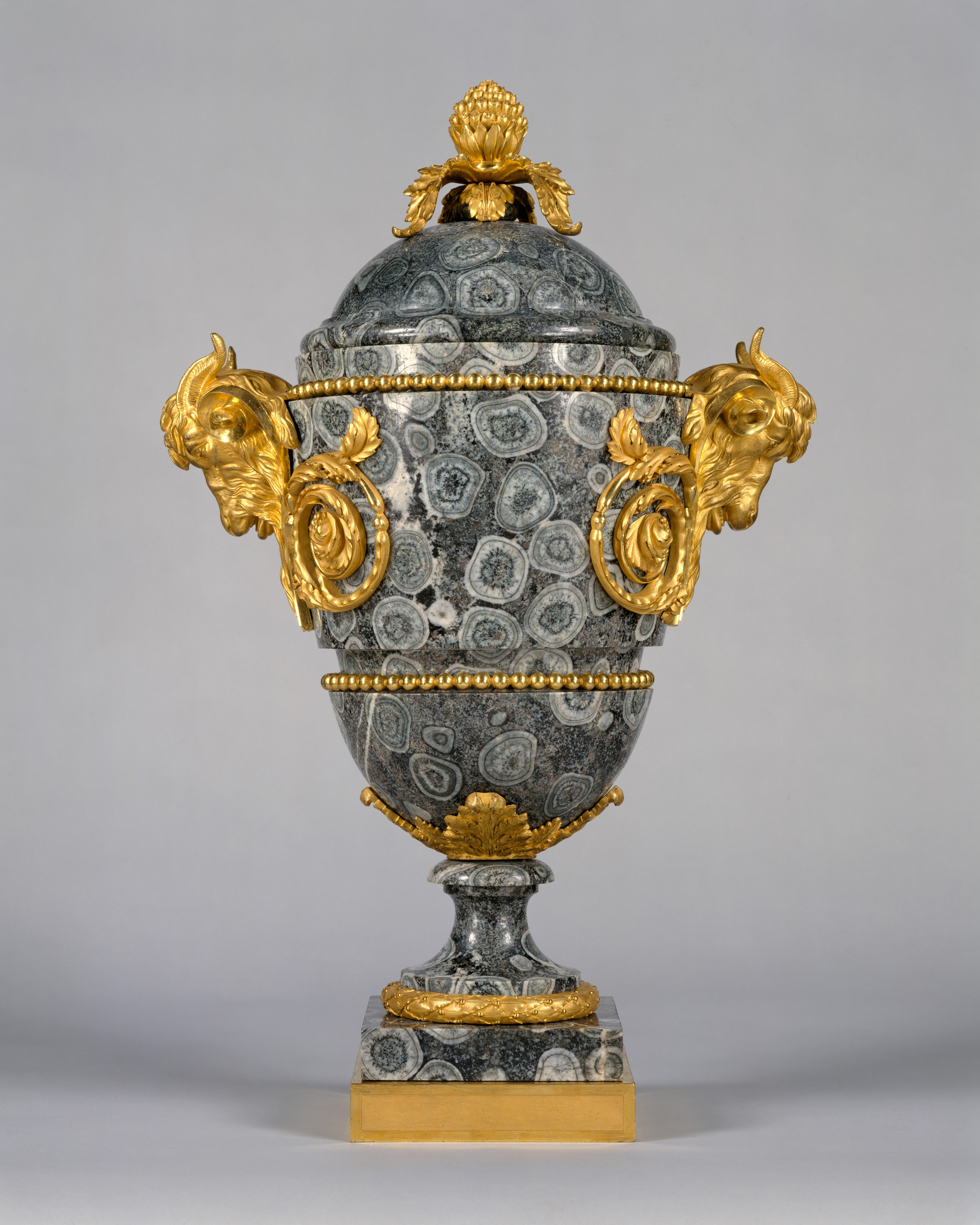
Vase with gilt bronze ornaments; c. 1780; 61 cm × 40.6 cm (24.0 in × 16.0 in); Metropolitan Museum of Art

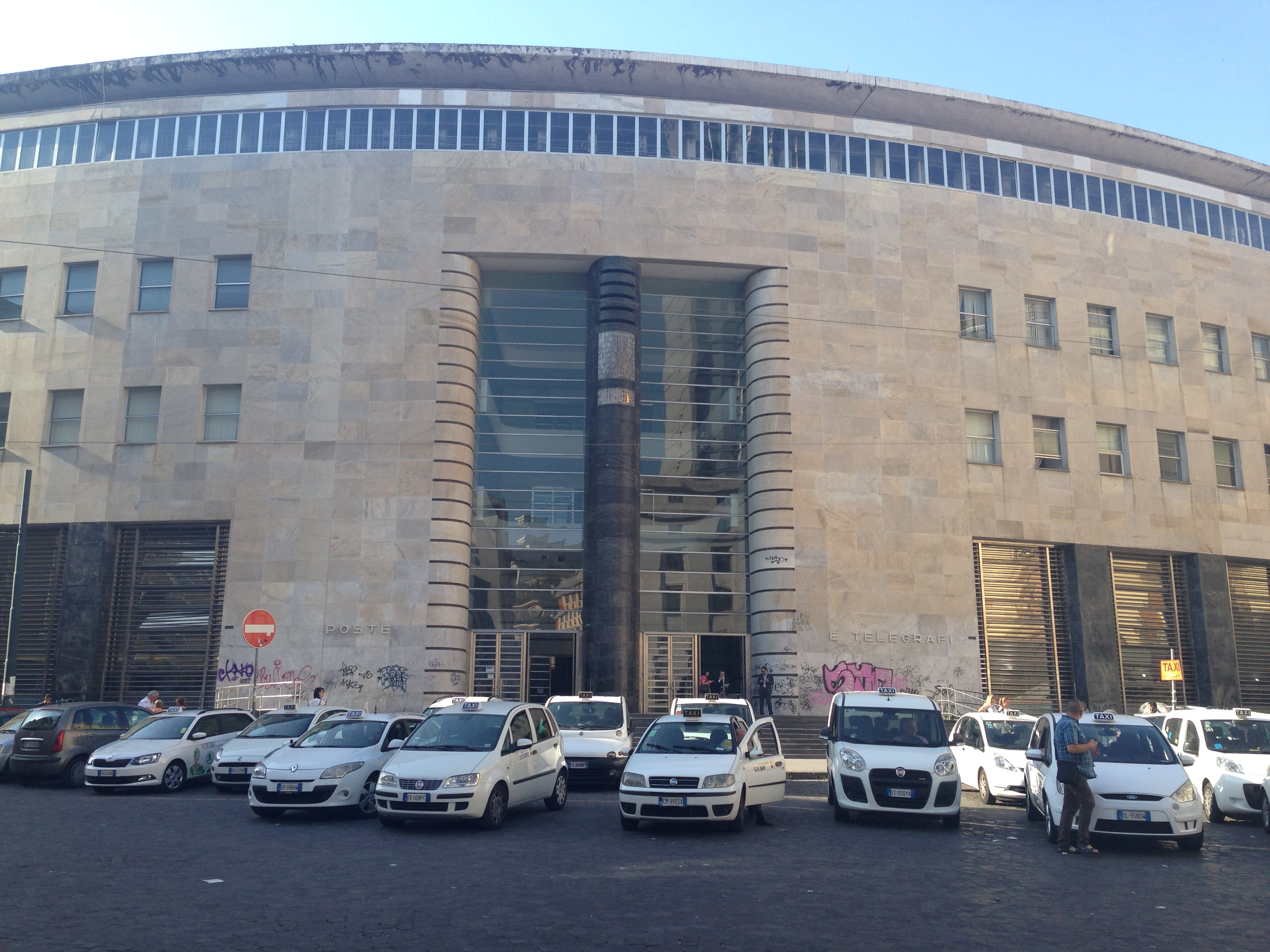
Palazzo delle Poste, Naples, Italy, Gino Franzi, 1936. Modernism, constructed with marble and diorite.

== See also ==
- List of rock types
