= Järnforsen =

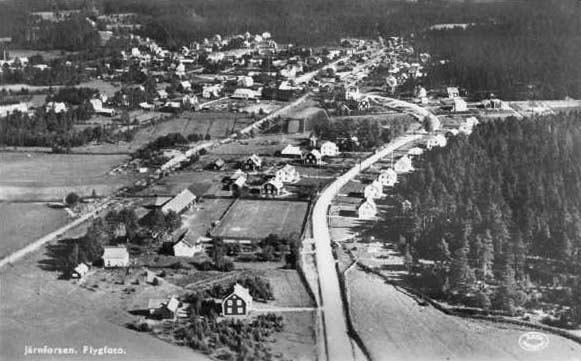
- Järnforsen in 1937

- Location within Kalmar Location within Sweden
- Coordinates: 57°25′N 15°37′E
- Country: Sweden
- Province: Småland
- County: Kalmar County
- Municipality: Hultsfred Municipality

Area
  - Total: 1.35 km^{2} (0.52 sq mi)

Population (31 December 2010)
  - Total: 489
  - Density: 363/km^{2} (940/sq mi)
- Time zone: UTC+1 (CET)
  - Summer (DST): UTC+2 (CEST)

Järnforsen is a locality situated in Hultsfred Municipality, Kalmar County, Sweden, with a population of 489 in 2010.

South of Järnforsen, in Slättemossa, there is a deposit of orbicular granite.
