= Vena, Sweden =

Vena
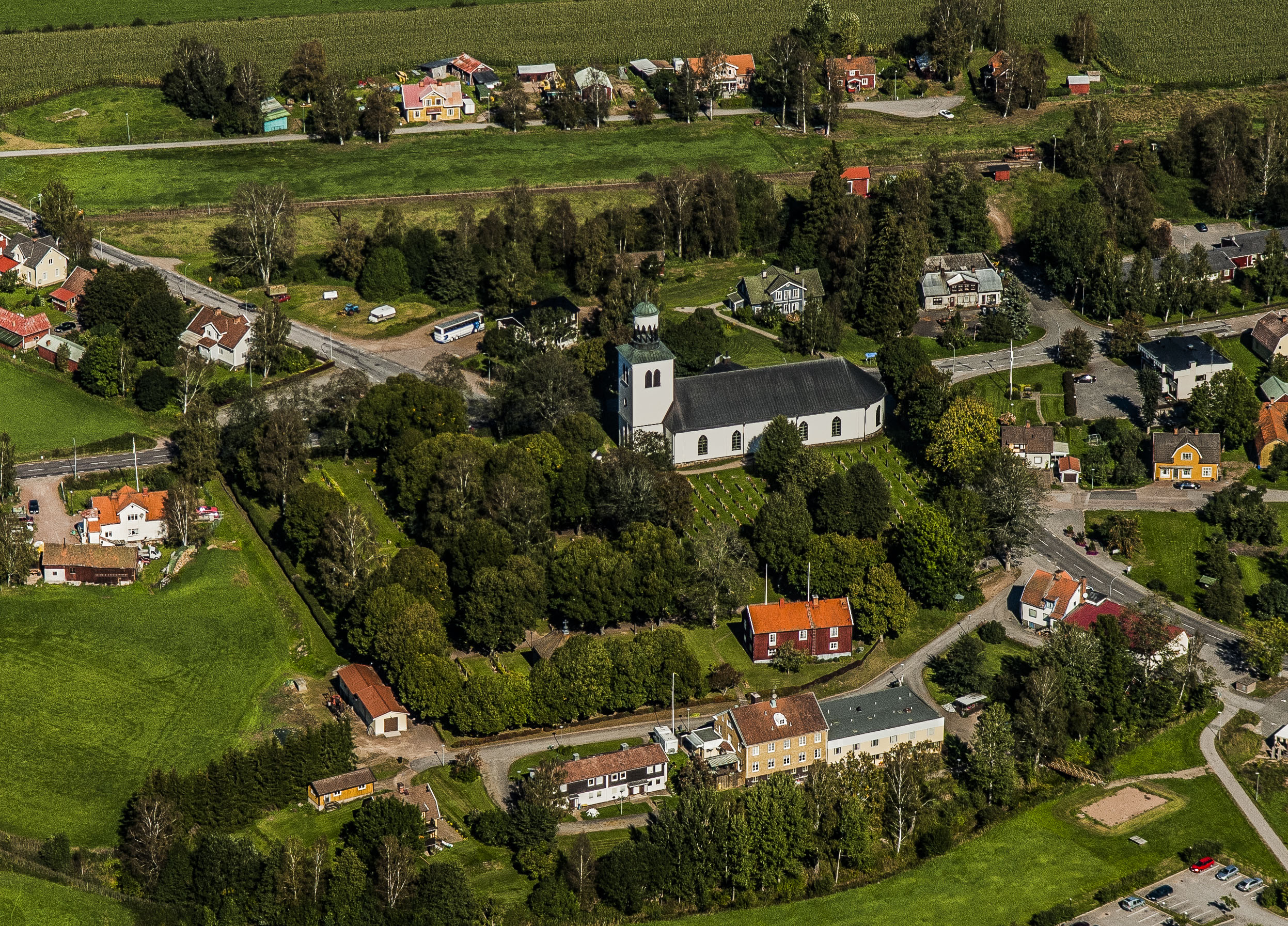

- Location within Kalmar Location within Sweden
- Coordinates: 57°32′N 15°58′E
- Country: Sweden
- Province: Småland
- County: Kalmar County
- Municipality: Hultsfred Municipality

Area
  - Total: 0.79 km^{2} (0.31 sq mi)

Population (31 December 2010)
  - Total: 367
  - Density: 464/km^{2} (1,200/sq mi)
- Time zone: UTC+1 (CET)
  - Summer (DST): UTC+2 (CEST)

Vena is a locality situated in Hultsfred Municipality, Kalmar County, Sweden with 367 inhabitants in 2010.
