= Rosenfors =

Borgholm
- Location within Kalmar Location within Sweden
- Coordinates: 57°22′N 15°50′E
- Country: Sweden
- Province: Småland
- County: Kalmar County
- Municipality: Hultsfred Municipality

Area
  - Total: 0.71 km^{2} (0.27 sq mi)

Population (31 December 2010)
  - Total: 281
  - Density: 397/km^{2} (1,030/sq mi)
- Time zone: UTC+1 (CET)
  - Summer (DST): UTC+2 (CEST)

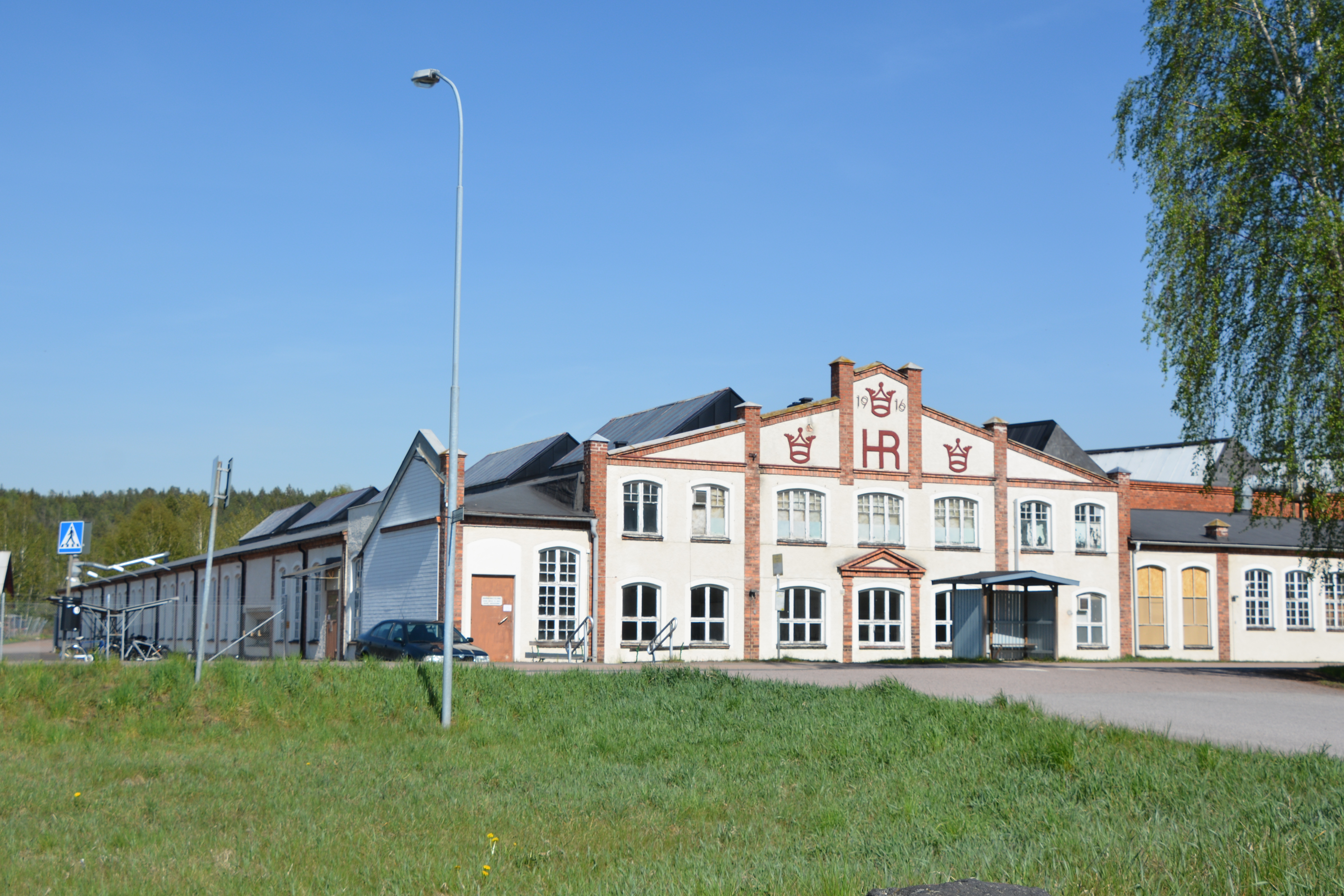
Rosenfors Bruk

Rosenfors is a locality situated in Hultsfred Municipality, Kalmar County, Sweden, with 281 inhabitants in 2010.
