= Nepheline-bearing diorite =

Form of intrusive igneous rock

Nepheline-bearing diorite is an intrusive rock with a composition intermediate between diorite and nepheline diorite. It is defined in the QAPF classification as coarse-grained igneous rock in which feldspathoids makes up 0% to 10% of the QAPF mineral fraction and are predominantly nepheline; plagioclase makes up 90% or more of the total feldspar content; and the plagioclase is sodium-rich (%An < 50).
