= Orbicular granite =

Uncommon plutonic rock type

- Igneous rock
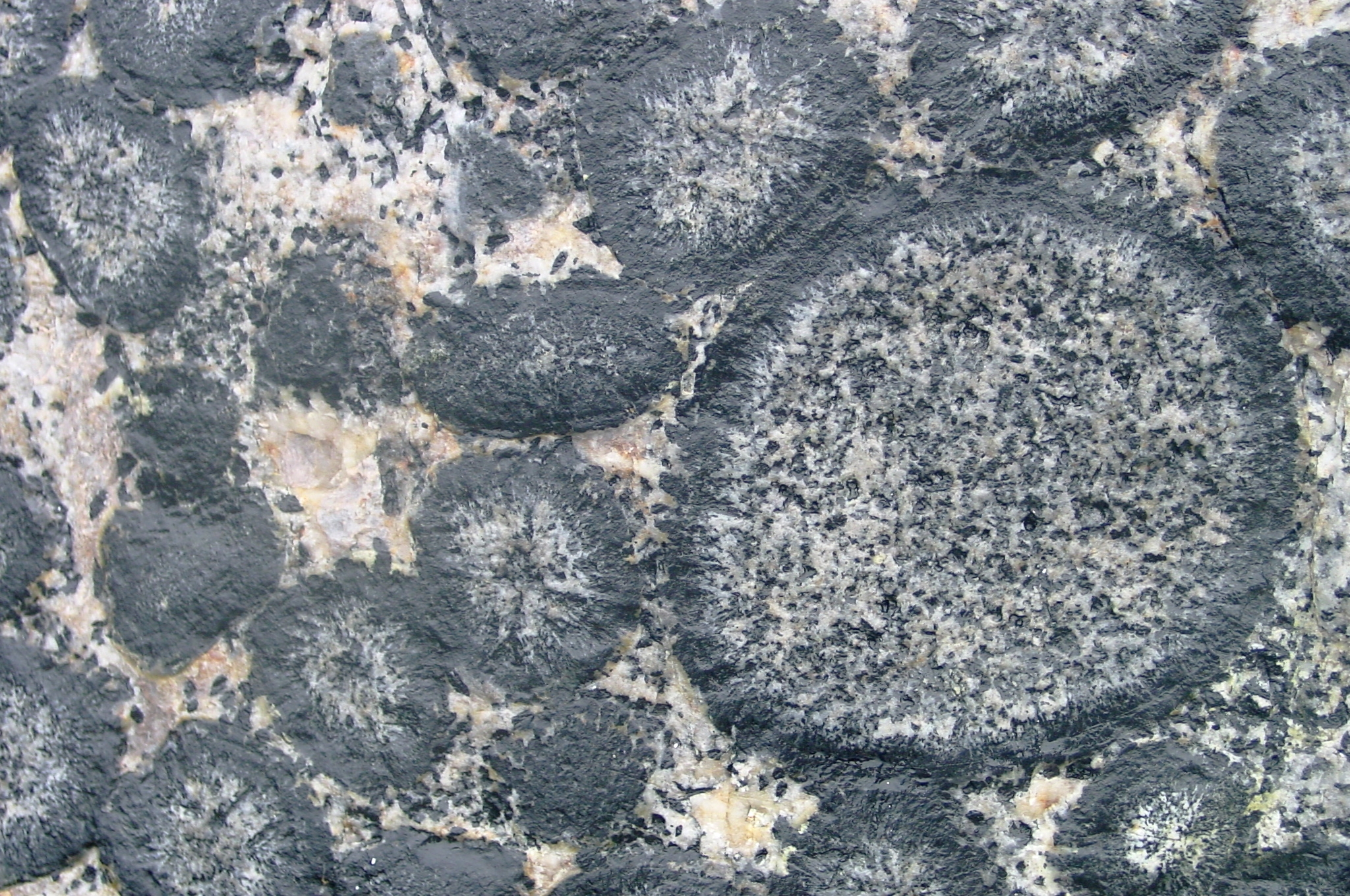

Composition
- Quartz; Alkali feldspar; Plagioclase; Hornblende; Biotite

Orbicular granite (also known as orbicular rock or orbiculite) is an uncommon plutonic rock type which is usually granitic in composition. These rocks have a unique appearance due to orbicules - concentrically layered, spheroidal structures, probably formed through nucleation around a grain in a cooling magma chamber due to rapid physical changes.

Almost one third of known orbicular rock occurrences are from Finland. The occurrences are usually very small.

== Occurrences ==
=== Chile ===
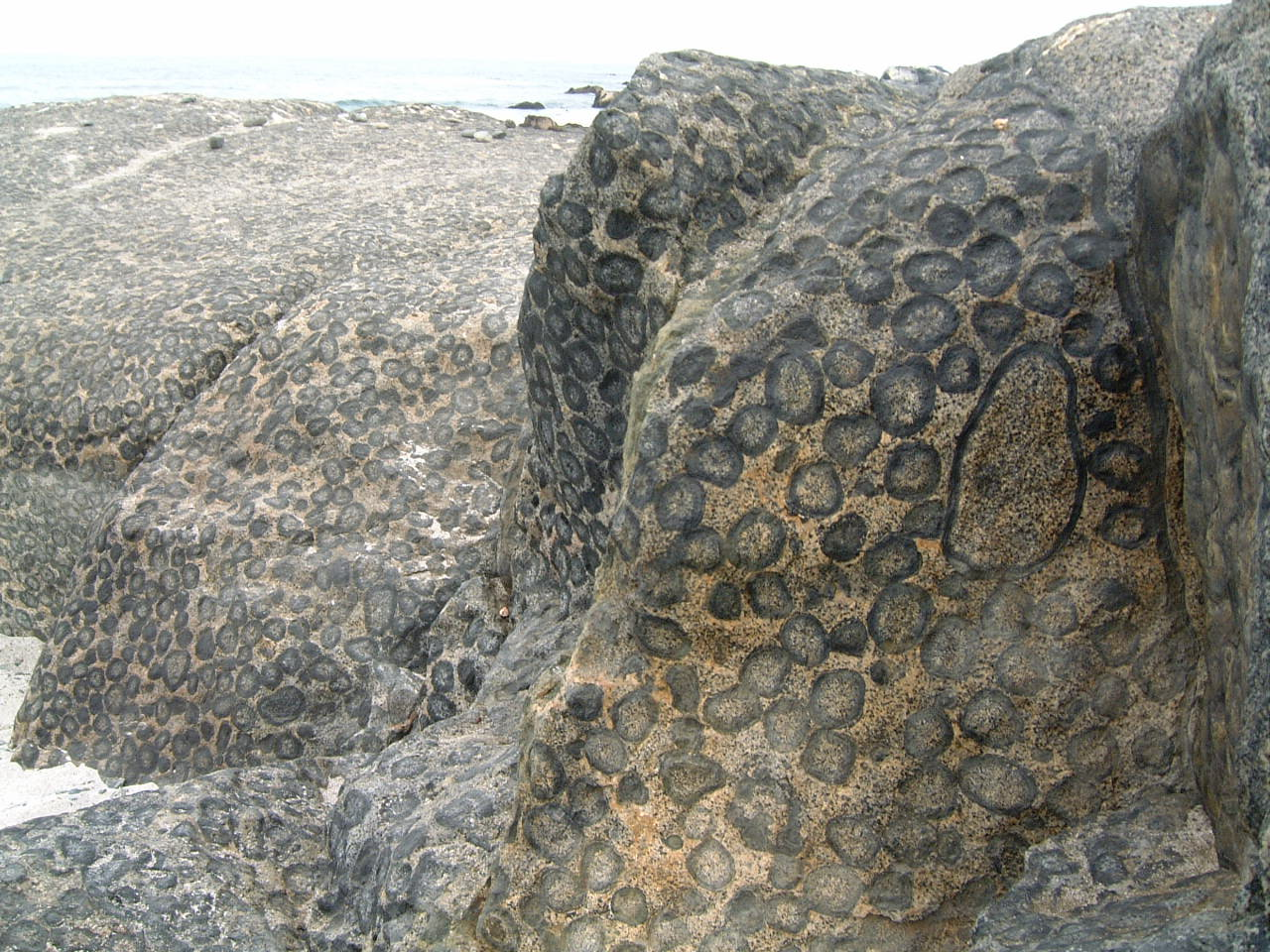
Outcrop of orbicular granite near Caldera, Chile.

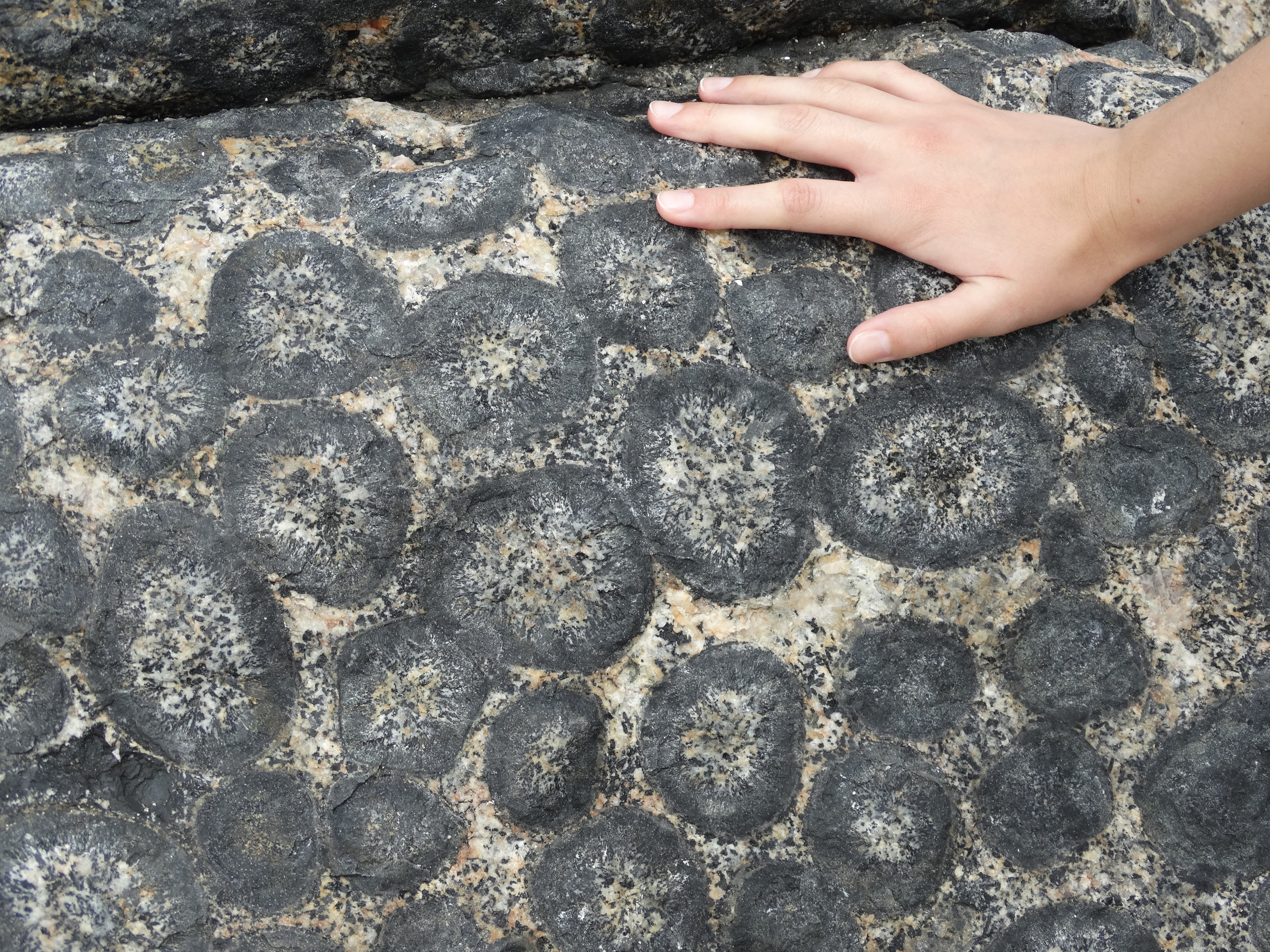
Close-up of orbicular granite near Caldera, Chile.

- On the coastline eleven kilometres north of Caldera, Northern Chile, there is a body of Jurassic orbicular granite which is dyke-like with an exposed surface area of approximately 375 m^{2}, enclosed in a tonalitic batholith. Where visible, the contact between country rock and the orbicular body is characterized by a zone of comb layering. The orbicular body has a porphyritic granodiorite matrix. The surface ratio of matrix/orbicules is 35/65; orbicules are mainly ellipsoidal with an average axis of 7.0 cm and are composed of a quartz diorite core and a single dark shell with a predominantly radial texture composed of equal amounts of plagioclase and amphibole accompanied by lesser amounts of clinopyroxene, biotite and magnetite. The core of the orbicules is polycrystalline and corresponds to a medium gray, medium grained (1.5 to 2.0 mm) quartz diorite composed of plagioclase, amphibole, quartz, biotite, small amounts of K-feldspar, clinopyroxene, and accessories, mainly magnetite. The texture is hypidiomorphic granular. There is a close petrographic similarity between the core of the orbicules, the non-orbicular inclusions and country rock. The site has been declared a protected area ("Santuario de la Naturaleza").
- An orbicular granodiorite exists at Cordón de Lila south of Salar de Atacama. The orbicular granodiorite occur in the form of a pipe that is part of the more extensive pluton of El León. Magmas forming these rocks cooled into rock in the Ordovician.
- A rare type of orbicular rock (locally known as Chaitenita) was discovered in Cerro Recoba, Chaitén, in 2017. The orbicular body consists of an irregular dyke of 75 m^{2} and is hosted by a granodiorite of Miocene age. The orbs are characterized by a single shell of 1 to 10 mm composed of radial plagioclase, quartz, and k-feldspar surrounding different kinds of igneous and, possibly, metamorphic cores.

=== South Africa ===
In the Namaqualand, South Africa, just west of the small town of Concordia, there is a rare occurrence of orbicular granite. The outcrop, known as Orbicule Hill or "wonderkoppie" (as it is locally known), is a provincial heritage site and one of just two known occurrences in South Africa. Another occurrence is on the farm Nigramoep just north west of Nababeep. This location has been impacted by blasting for copper mining and has not been rehabilitated. When cut and polished, the granite has a pinkish colour with lighter and darker shades of grey oval shaped or orbicular inclusions. Orbiculite has been used to make jewellery and other decorative items in the past, but due to its rarity in South Africa, it is not commercially exploited and has become more a curiosity due to it being considered something of an enigma in geology. The geology of the surrounding area can be described as gneissic and granitic and is better known for its once rich copper deposits. The rocks of this region form part of the mid Proterozoic Eon and formed approximately one billion years ago.

=== Other localities ===
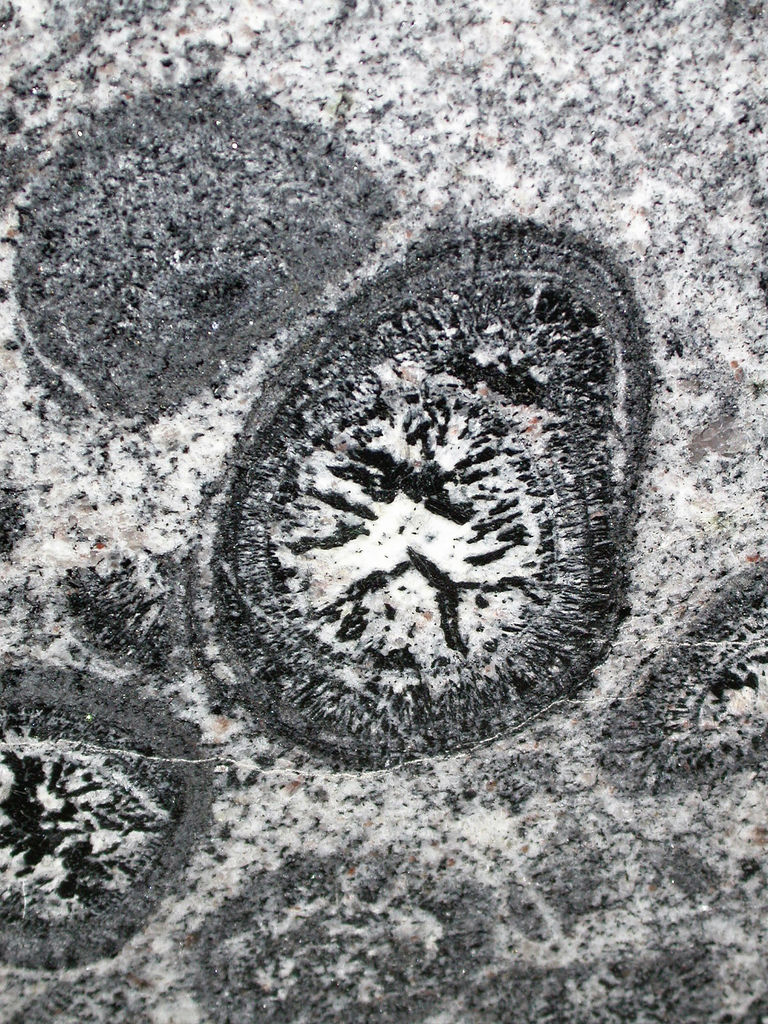
Polished rock sample of orbicular granite from Mount Magnet, Western Australia

Africa

- Concordia, South Africa
- Matobo National Park, Zimbabwe

Asia

- Pichor, Bundelkhand Massif, India

Antarctica

- Cape Geology in Granite Harbour, McMurdo Sound, Antarctica
- Taylor Valley in Antarctica

Europe

- Kuru, Finland
- Savitaipale, Finland
- Slättemossa, south of Järnforsen, Hultsfred, Sweden
- Mullaghderg, County Donegal, Ireland
- Peneda-Gerês National Park, Portugal

North America

- Powell River Area, British Columbia, Canada
- Sandia Mountains, New Mexico, USA
- Sierra Nevada Batholith, California, USA

Oceania

- Mount Magnet, Western Australia
- Karamea, New Zealand
- Split Apple Rock, Kaiteretere, New Zealand

== See also ==
- Rapakivi granite
- Partial melting
