= Silverdalen =

- Location within Kalmar Location within Sweden
- Coordinates: 57°32′32″N 15°44′59″E
- Country: Sweden
- Province: Småland
- County: Kalmar County
- Municipality: Hultsfred Municipality

Area
  - Total: 1.39 km^{2} (0.54 sq mi)

Population (31 December 2010)
  - Total: 725
  - Density: 522/km^{2} (1,350/sq mi)
- Time zone: UTC+1 (CET)
  - Summer (DST): UTC+2 (CEST)

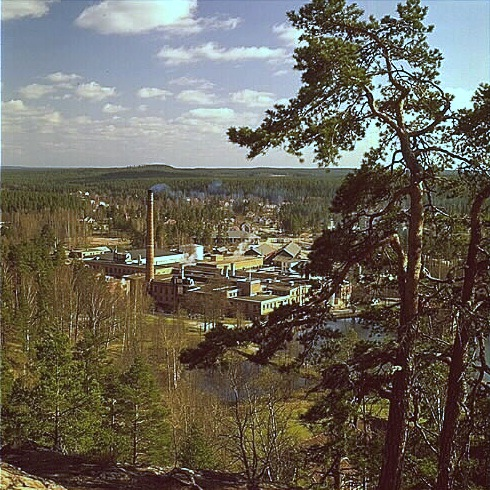
Silverdalen, c. 1960s

Silverdalen (Swedish for The Silver Valley) is a locality situated in Hultsfred Municipality, Kalmar County, Sweden with 725 inhabitants in 2010.

The Nässjö - Oskarshamn railway line passes through the settlement since 1874. It was given the name Silverdalen in 1931. Before that it was either called Hällefors or Råsa-Lönneberga. The paper mill located here was founded around 1874 and was in operation until year 2002 when M-real (which had taken over as owner in 2000) closed down its operation. The Municipality also had a railway which was completed in 1874. The initial name of the railway stop was Rasa which later was later changed at the same time with the paper mill in 1931. Together, they were named Silverdalen after a naming dispute with the Swedish postal service. The train station was later closed down in 2014. As of 2020, the population of Silverdalen was estimated to have declined to 666, with the male population being at 330 while the female was at 336.
