= Morlunda, West Virginia =

- Unincorporated community
- Location within West Virginia Location within the United States
- Coordinates: 37°49′53″N 80°29′29″W
- Country: United States
- State: West Virginia
- County: Greenbrier
- Elevation: 2,047 ft (624 m)
- Time zone: UTC-5 (Eastern (EST))
  - Summer (DST): UTC-4 (EDT)
- Area codes: 304 & 681
- GNIS feature ID: 1556328

Morlunda is an unincorporated community in Greenbrier County, West Virginia, United States. Morlunda is 3.5 miles (5.6 km) northwest of Lewisburg.

Its name, meaning "wooded marsh", was taken from the small town of Mörlunda in the southern Swedish province of Småland.
