= Hultsfred Municipality =

Hultsfred Municipality Hultsfreds kommun
- Municipality
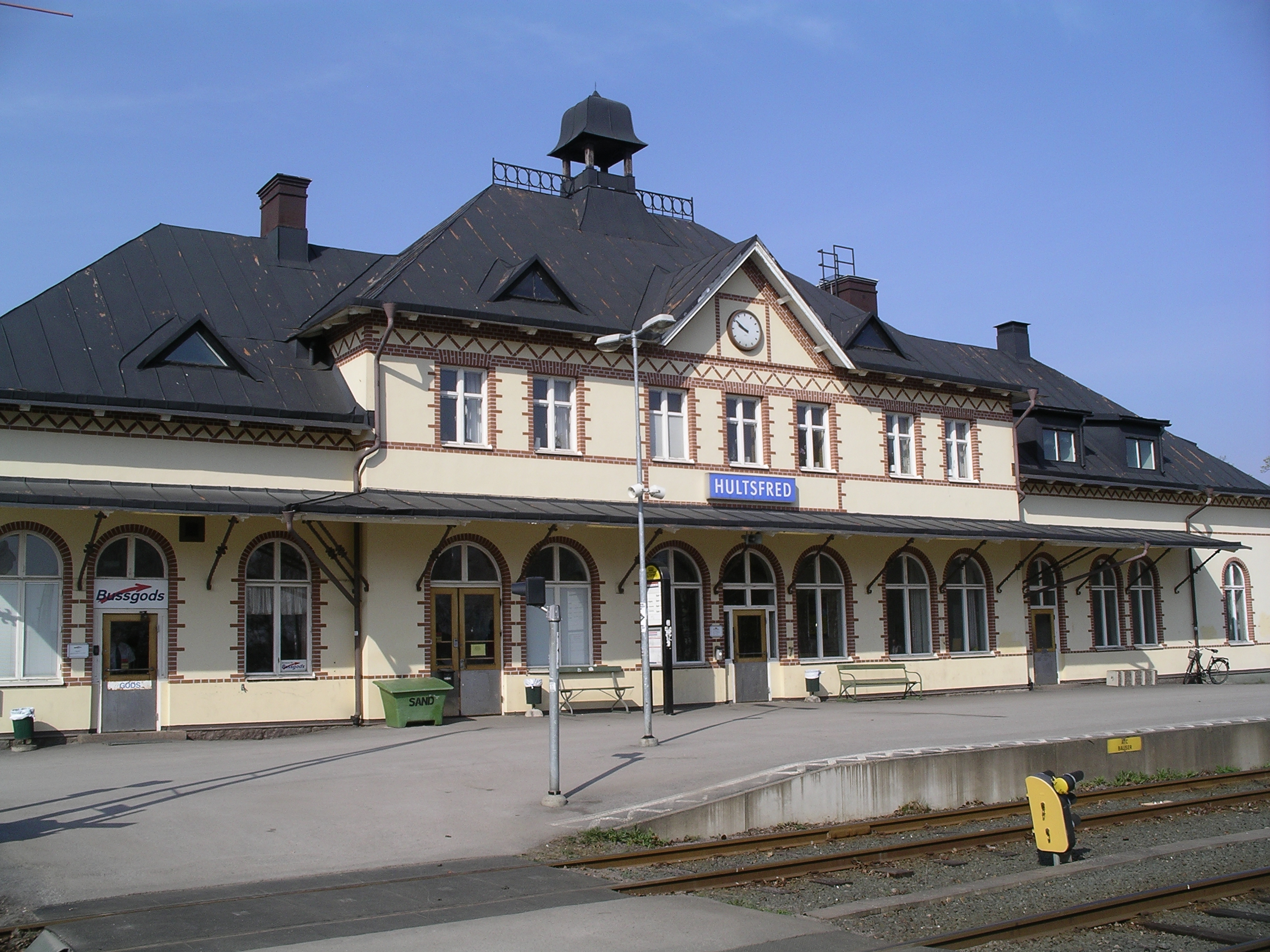
- Hultsfred Railway Station

- Coat of arms

- Coordinates: 57°29′N 15°50′E
- Country: Sweden
- County: Kalmar County
- Seat: Hultsfred

Area
  - Total: 1,187.01 km^{2} (458.31 sq mi)
  - Land: 1,121.52 km^{2} (433.02 sq mi)
  - Water: 65.49 km^{2} (25.29 sq mi)
- Area as of 1 January 2014.

Population (30 June 2025)
  - Total: 13,609
  - Density: 12.134/km^{2} (31.428/sq mi)
- Time zone: UTC+1 (CET)
  - Summer (DST): UTC+2 (CEST)
- ISO 3166 code: SE
- Province: Småland
- Municipal code: 0860
- Website: www.hultsfred.se
- Density is calculated using land area only.

Hultsfred Municipality (Swedish: Hultsfreds kommun) is a municipality in Kalmar County, in south-eastern Sweden. The seat is in the town of Hultsfred.

The present municipality was created in 1971 through the amalgamation of the market town (köping) of Hultsfred (instituted in 1927) with a number of surrounding municipalities. In 1863 there were eight entities in the area.

Hultsfred is known as the site of a major rock festival in Sweden, the Hultsfred Festival.

== History ==
In the age known as the Nordic Bronze Age, the area had some shipping of furs to northern Germany and the Roman army, but not much is known from that time other than the area being inhabited; there have also been older finds from 3000 to 4000 BC. However, from the medieval age, around 1100 AD, a few churches remain.

The area continued to be inhabited mainly by farmers until the 20th century. In the 17th and 18th there was some production of iron in Kalmar County, totalling about 10 mines; of those 2 were located in the municipality of Hultsfred. Hultsfred was a center for some military exercising companies during the 19th century, and some remaining building can be visited in the vicinity of Silverån. When the railroads through Sweden were built late in that century, Hultsfred received a population boost.

There are several folks museums around the area that keeps trace of its history.

== Geography ==
Basically every one of the localities of Hultsfred Municipality are situated on the railway. Besides Hultsfred, in the mid north of the municipality, there are the towns of Virserum in the south-west and other ever smaller settlements such as Lönneberga, Silverdalen and Målilla. The population of the municipality has however been decreasing with some 2,000 people in the last 10 years, as many people move to larger cities, causing a decrease in nativity.

Much of the geography is taken up with forests, a notability for the entire province of Småland, with some few scattered areas suitable for agriculture.

=== Localities ===
There are eight urban areas (also called a Tätort or locality) in Hultsfred Municipality.

In the table the localities are listed according to the size of the population as of December 31, 2005. The municipal seat is in bold characters.

#	Locality	Population
1	**Hultsfred**	5,305
2	Virserum	1,847
3	Målilla	1,605
4	Mörlunda	956
5	Silverdalen	791
6	Järnforsen	539
7	Vena	380
8	Rosenfors	308

== Demographics ==
This is a demographic table based on Hultsfred Municipality's electoral districts in the 2022 Swedish general election sourced from SVT's election platform, in turn taken from SCB official statistics.

In total there were 14,027 residents, including 10,283 Swedish citizens of voting age. 47.4% voted for the left coalition and 50.9% for the right coalition. Indicators are in percentage points except population totals and income.

Location	Residents	Citizen adults	Left vote	Right vote	Employed	Swedish parents	Foreign heritage	Income SEK	Degree
Location			%	%					
Ekeberg	1,664	1,270	59.6	37.5	73	68	32	21,173	24
Hultsfred N	2,544	1,907	49.6	49.1	82	81	19	25,421	26
Hultsfred S	1,606	1,033	56.6	41.2	65	54	46	19,789	26
Järeda	569	426	42.9	53.6	79	80	20	24,270	22
Lönneberga	1,015	776	44.9	53.3	78	80	20	22,293	29
Målilla	1,796	1,309	45.5	53.6	75	80	20	21,859	22
Mörlunda	1,542	1,130	40.9	57.6	78	80	20	20,530	27
Vena	1,076	829	41.7	57.0	87	92	8	24,461	29
Virserum	2,215	1,603	41.3	57.9	70	72	28	20,729	23
Source: SVT

== International relations ==
=== Twin towns — Sister cities ===
Hultsfred Municipality is twinned with:

- Rumia, Poland
