= Mörlunda =

- Location within Kalmar Location within Sweden
- Coordinates: 57°19′N 15°51′E
- Country: Sweden
- Province: Småland
- County: Kalmar County
- Municipality: Hultsfred Municipality

Area
  - Total: 2.19 km^{2} (0.85 sq mi)

Population (31 December 2010)
  - Total: 838
  - Density: 382/km^{2} (990/sq mi)
- Time zone: UTC+1 (CET)
  - Summer (DST): UTC+2 (CEST)

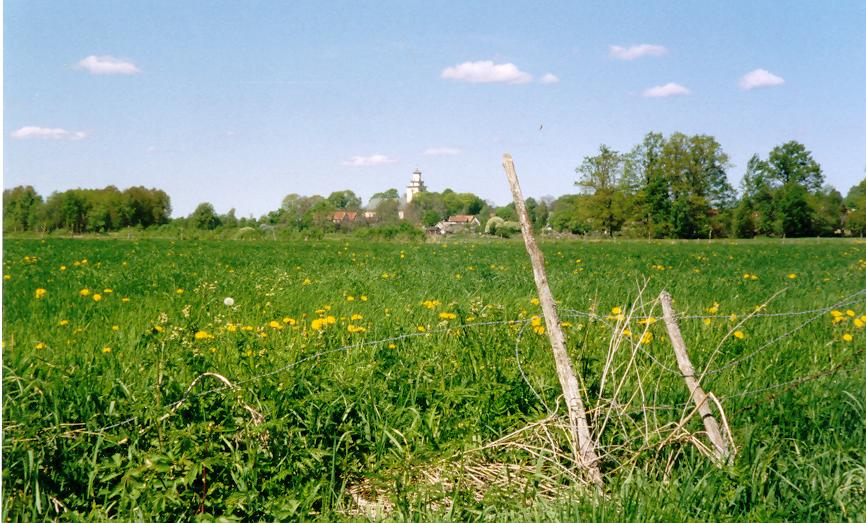
Mörlunda church and surrounding farmland

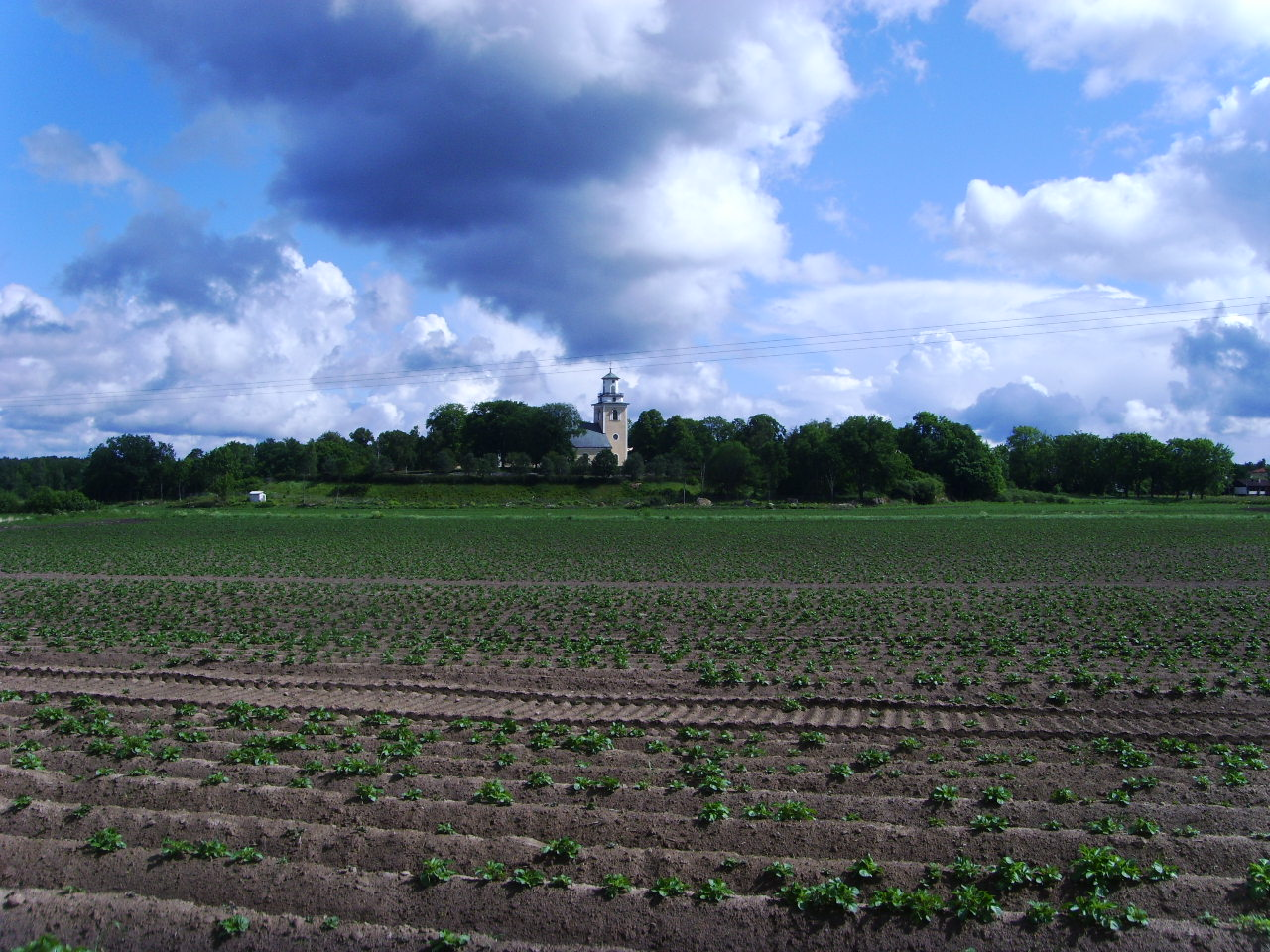
Mörlunda church and surrounding farmland

Mörlunda is a locality situated in Hultsfred Municipality, Kalmar County, Sweden with 838 inhabitants in 2010.

It gave its name to a community in Greenbrier County, West Virginia. The name means "wooded marsh", a fitting description for its surroundings.
