= Hultsfred =

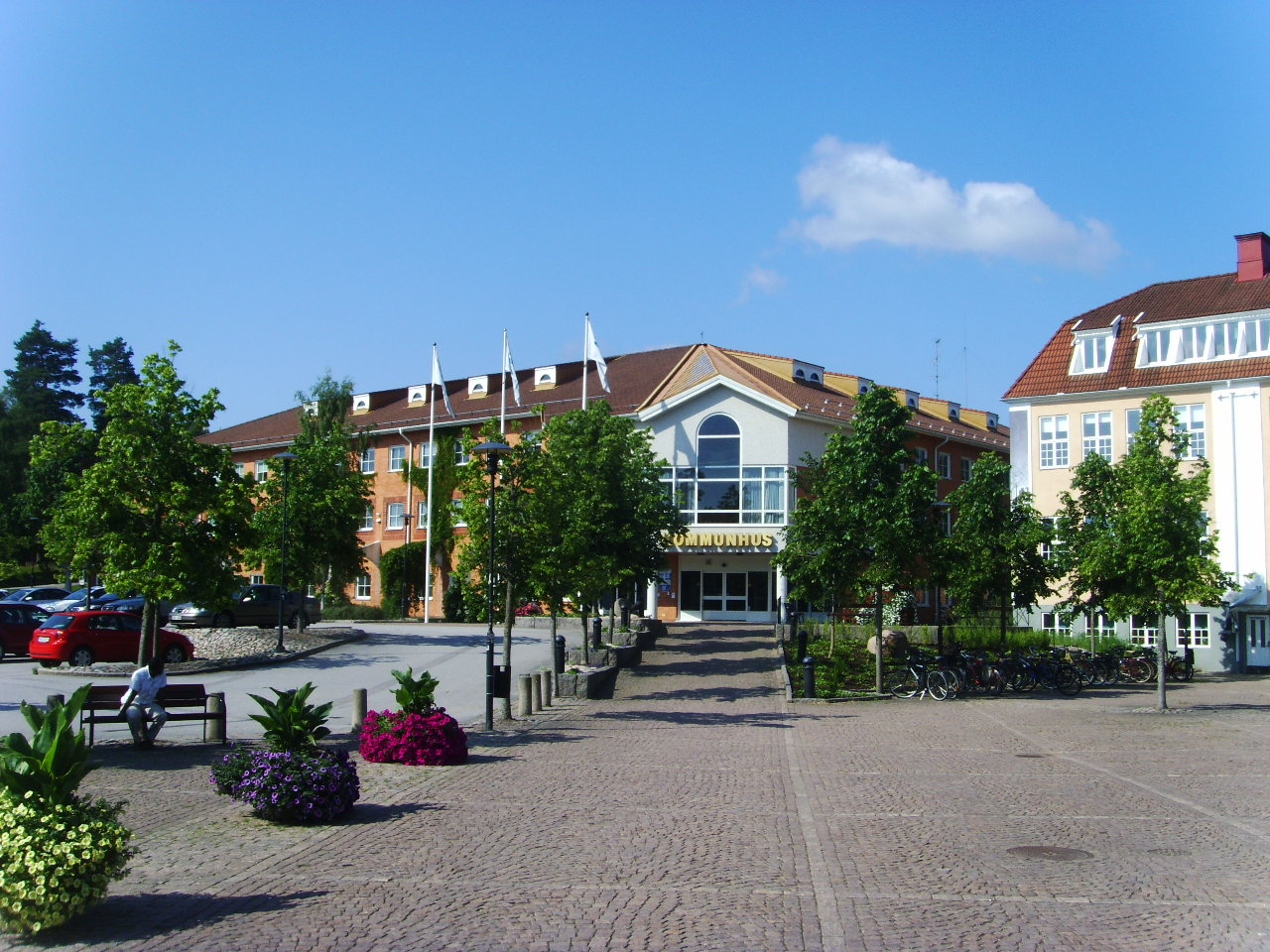
- Hultsfred in July 2009

- Location within Kalmar Location within Sweden
- Coordinates: 57°29′N 15°50′E
- Country: Sweden
- Province: Småland
- County: Kalmar County
- Municipality: Hultsfred Municipality

Area
  - Total: 6.09 km^{2} (2.35 sq mi)

Population (31 December 2021)
  - Total: 5,672
  - Density: 844/km^{2} (2,190/sq mi)
- Time zone: UTC+1 (CET)
  - Summer (DST): UTC+2 (CEST)
- Website: http://www.hultsfred.se/

Hultsfred (Swedish pronunciation: [ˈhɵ̌ltsfrɛd]) is a locality and the seat of Hultsfred Municipality, Kalmar County, Sweden with 5,143 inhabitants in 2010. It is best known for the Hultsfred Festival.
