= Restite =

Restite is the residual material left at the site of melting during the in place production of magma.

Generally, restite is composed of a predominance of mafic minerals because these are harder to melt (see Bowen's reaction series). Typical minerals are amphibole, biotite, pyroxene, ilmenite or other iron oxides and some plagioclase feldspar. When chunks of restite are caught up within the granite it is known as a restite inclusion or enclave.

== S-type restite reactions ==
Restite in S-type granites is produced from the melting, within the Earth's crust, of a typical metamorphic mineral assemblage of high-pressure gneiss of sedimentary origin;

biotite + quartz + feldspars → hydroxyl-bearing melt + orthopyroxene + cordierite + residual feldspars

The melt reaction produces a granitic melt and solid orthopyroxene and cordierite.

Cordierite in restite inclusions is unstable at low pressures; this reverts to Al-rich mica and quartz during ascent with the entraining magma. Orthopyroxene, unstable at low temperatures, reverts to an assemblage of biotite plus quartz. Restite feldspars will typically be a sodic plagioclase. Thus, restite inclusions in S-type granites will be a recrystallised granoblastic textured inclusion of biotite-muscovite-feldspar-quartz.

If the restite minerals are carried with the magma, as the minerals become thermo-barometrically unstable during ascent, they will react back with the magma to form biotite from orthopyroxene, and feldspar or mica from cordierite. These reactions also involve consumption of significant quantities of water, and hence, will preclude the generation of a hydrothermal solution.

== I-type restite reactions ==
Restite reactions in I-type granites are essentially similar, but due to the mafic and granitic source rocks, the restite assemblage is predisposed to produce an orthopyroxene + clinopyroxene + plagioclase +/- garnet assemblage. Similar to the reactions occurring in S-type granites, the restite minerals will revert to hornblende and plagioclase upon ascent, resorbing water and precluding generation of hydrothermal solutions.

Porphyry copper deposits are generally associated with I-type granites which are not restite mediated.

== Importance of restite ==
Restite is an important constituent in fractional crystallisation and igneous differentiation processes.

Restite acts as a form of buffer within magma, acting as a reservoir primarily of water and water-adsorbent minerals, which may prevent or retard a granitic magma from attaining water saturation. This is analogous to the behaviour of a chemical buffer solution or mineral redox buffer except in this case it is a mineral-water exchange.

This process occurs by hydration of ferromagnesian minerals, particularly hornblende, which may adsorb up to 5% H_{2}O, and by conversion of pyroxene to hornblende during melting or fractionation at temperatures below the pyroxene stability field. This process is envisaged as, for instance, pyroxene-bearing restite inclusions 'soaking up' water and being converted to hydrous hornblende-bearing inclusions.

Secondly, restite acts as a compositional buffer, providing elements to the surrounding magma as it is melted and ground up by erosive forces within the ascending magma. Restite can, in large enough amounts, retard the compositional changes of a magma either via providing more reagents or physically trapping crystals within the magma.

Generally, restite is not present within magmas in large amounts and thus the effects of the above processes are not usually profound. However, it is likely that, particularly for S-type granite which is formed by wholesale anatexis (melting) of metasedimentary rocks, restite mediated melting and fractionation is crucial to the composition and behaviour of these magmas.

In magmas which do not have a restite component, such as most M-type granites, some A-type granites, and most basaltic magmas, it is much easier for these magmas to achieve more dramatic fractional crystallization effects.

== See also ==
- Migmatite
- Igneous rock
