= Mawchi =

Region in Kayah State, Myanmar

Coordinates: 18°49′N 97°09′E

Mawchi is a region in the Bawlake district of the Kayah State (formerly called Karenni State) of Myanmar.

In the 1930s, the Mawchi Mine was the world's most important source of tungsten. Mawchi contained the world's largest granite-hosted tin-tungsten vein system before World War II. From 1930 to 1940, ore production amounted to 2,000 to 6,000 tonnes annually, which amounted to 60% of Myanmar's total production, and one-third of the world's tungsten. From 1980 to 2010, 25,000 tonnes of tin-tungsten ore were produced. Mawchi is located in the Western Granite Province, composed of Cretaceous to Eocene I-type granites and S-type granites, dominated by ilmenite-series rocks of granodioritic and syenogranitic composition.

On January 28 in the Myanmar Civil War, the town was seized by the KNDF.
