= Migmatite =

Mixture of metamorphic rock and igneous rock

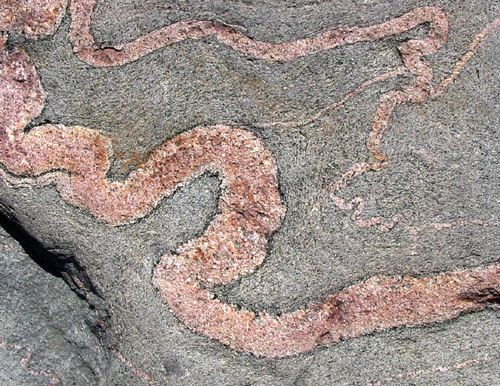
Ptygmatic folding in migmatite on Naissaar Island, Estonia

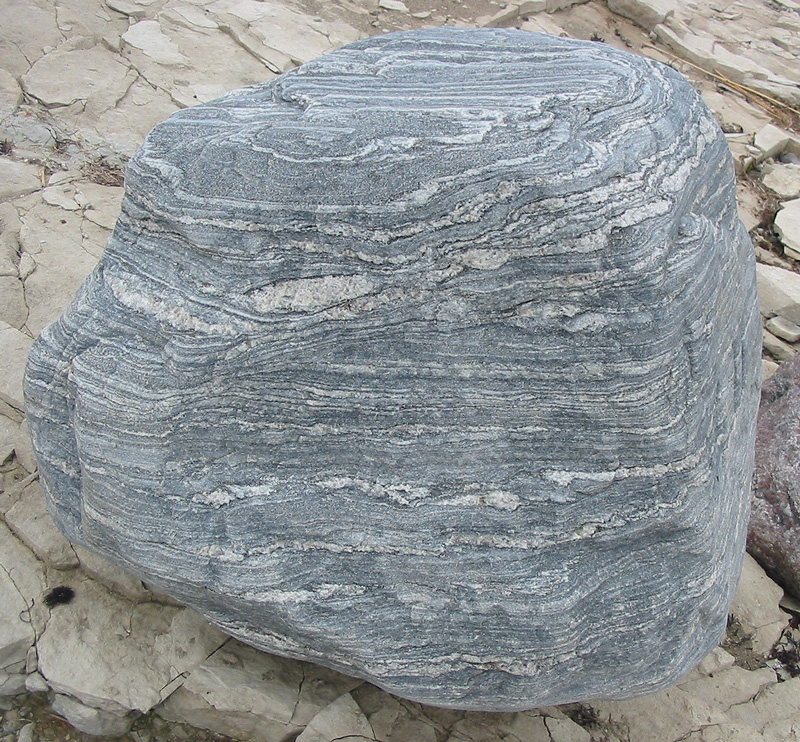
Migmatite on the coast of Saaremaa, Estonia

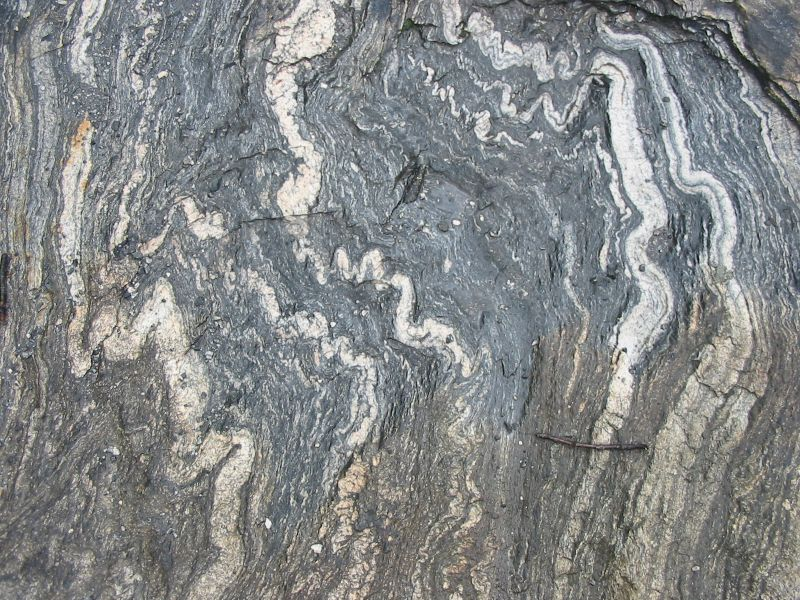
Intricately-folded migmatite from near Geirangerfjord, Norway

Migmatite is a rock formed under high-grade metamorphism by partial melting (anatexis), producing a mixture of metamorphic and newly formed igneous material. It typically occurs in the deeper parts of the continental crust, commonly within Precambrian cratonic blocks, and represents a transitional stage between metamorphic and igneous rocks.

Migmatites form during prograde metamorphism when rocks reach temperatures and pressures sufficient for partial melting. The newly formed material, known as the neosome, commonly consists of light-coloured leucosome and darker melanosome, while remnants of the original rock form the paleosome; an intermediate mesosome may also be present.

Migmatites commonly display distinctive banding and folded structures, including ptygmatic folds, produced by melt migration and ductile deformation. They have long been regarded as linking regional metamorphism, crustal melting, and the origin of granitic rocks, and remain central to research on the evolution of the continental crust.

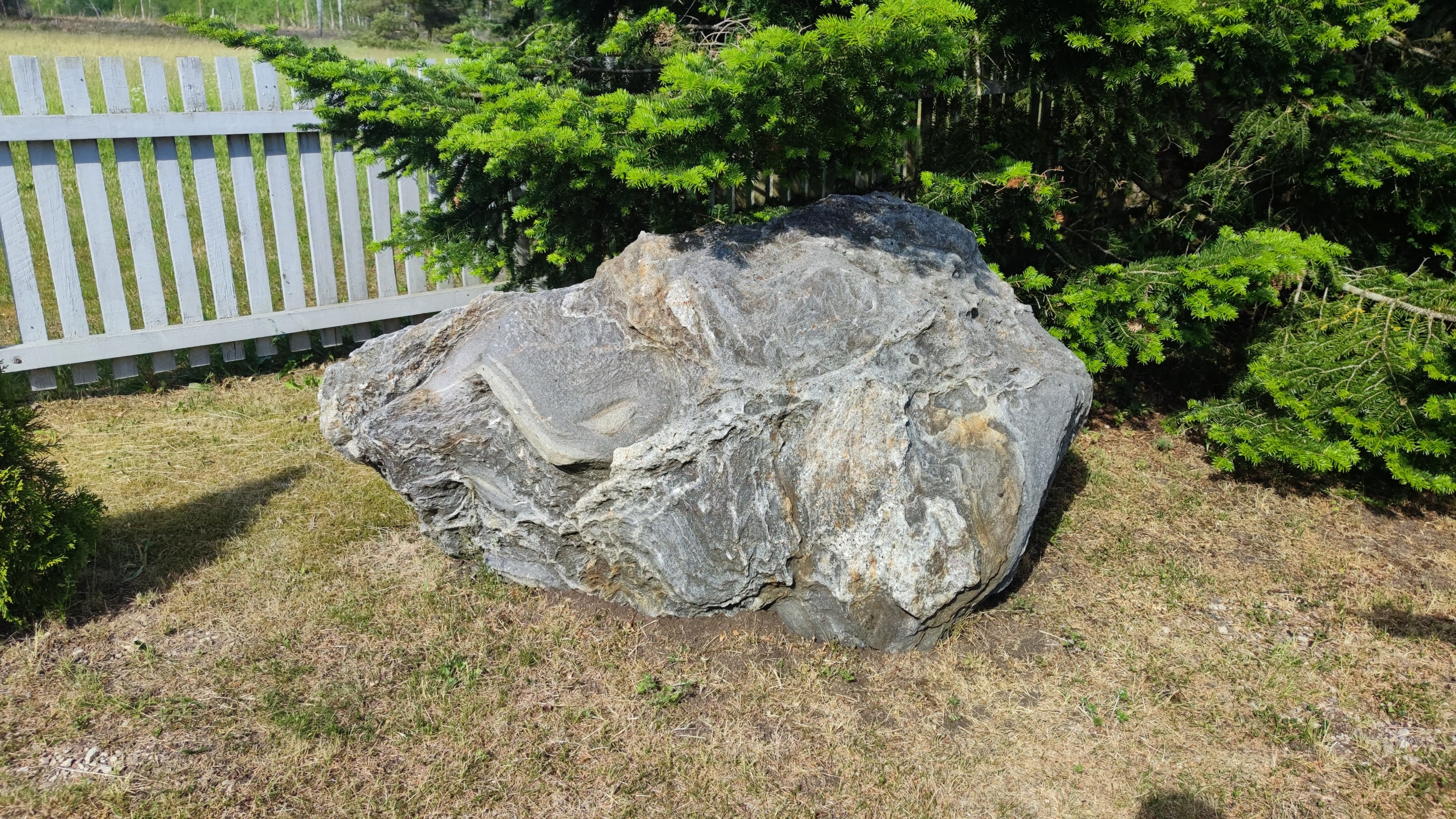
Migmatite rock in Saaremaa, Estonia

== The diagenesis - metamorphism sequence ==
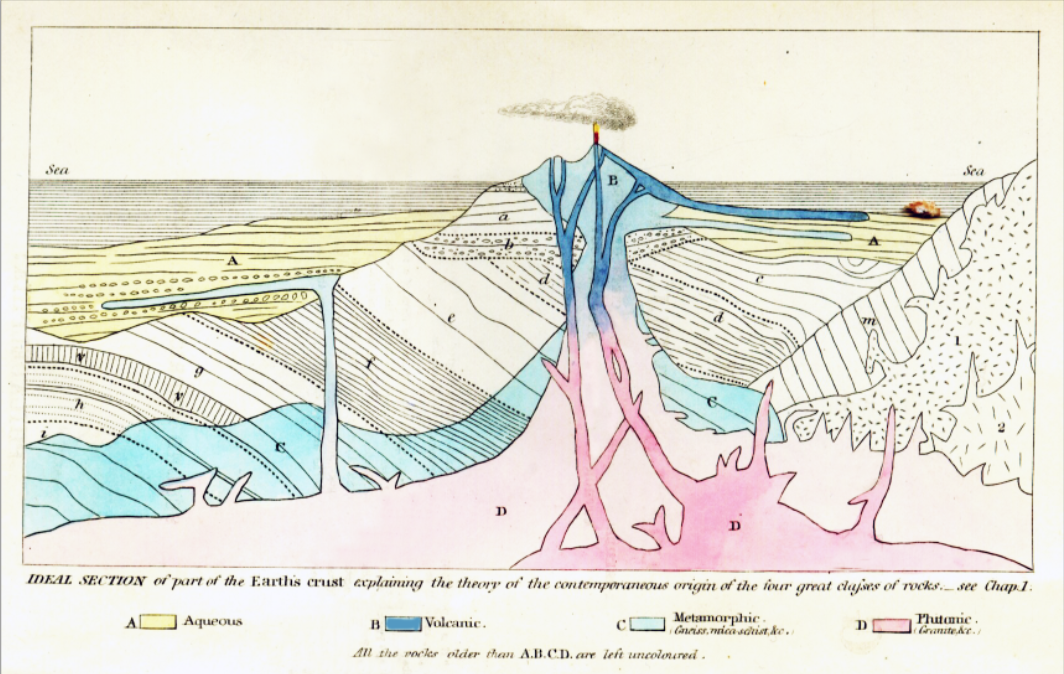
An early geological cross-section of the Earth's crust

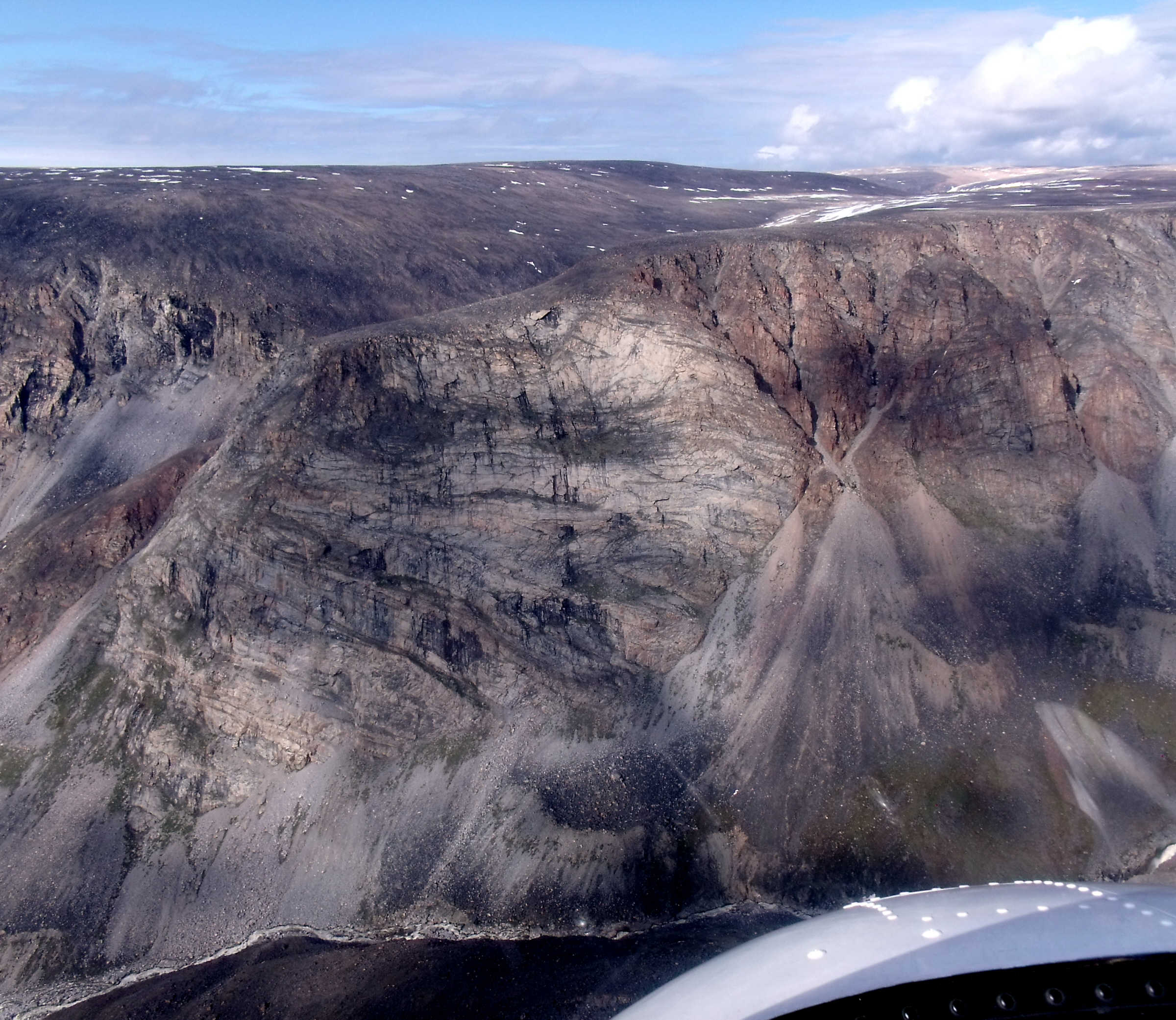
Aerial view of Proterozoic banded migmatite, deep fiord near Pond Inlet, Baffin Island, Nunavut.

Migmatite is the penultimate member of a sequence of lithology transformations first identified by Lyell, 1837. Lyell had a clear perception of the regional diagenesis sequence in sedimentary rocks that remains valid today. It begins 'A' with deposition of unconsolidated sediment (protolith for future metamorphic rocks). As temperature and pressure increase with depth, a protolith passes through a diagenetic sequence from porous sedimentary rock through indurated rocks and phyllites 'A2' to metamorphic schists 'C1' in which the initial sedimentary components can still be discerned. Deeper still, the schists are reconstituted as gneiss 'C2' in which folia of residual minerals alternate with quartzo-feldspathic layers; partial melting continues as small batches of leucosome coalesce to form distinct layers in the neosome, and become recognizable migmatite 'D1'. The resulting leucosome layers in stromatic migmatites still retain water and gas in a discontinuous reaction series from the paleosome. This supercritical H_{2}O and CO_{2} content renders the leucosome extremely mobile.

Bowen described the process as being ‘In part due to ... reactions between already crystallized mineral components of the rock and the remaining still-molten magma, and in part to reactions due to adjustments of equilibrium between the extreme end-stage, highly concentrated, "mother-liquor", which, by selective freezing, has been enriched with the more volatile gases usually termed "mineralizers," among which water figures prominently’. J.J. Sederholm (1926) described rocks of this type, demonstrably of mixed origin, as migmatites. He described the granitising 'ichors' as having properties intermediate between an aqueous solution and a very much diluted magma, with much of it in the gaseous state.

== Partial melting, anatexis and the role of water ==
The role of partial melting is demanded by experimental and field evidence. Rocks begin to partially melt when they reach a combination of sufficiently high temperatures (> 650 °C) and pressures (>34MPa). Some rocks have compositions that produce more melt than others at a given temperature, a rock property called fertility. Some minerals in a sequence will make more melt than others; some do not melt until a higher temperature is reached. If the temperature attained only just surpasses the solidus, the migmatite will contain a few small patches of melt scattered about in the most fertile rock. Holmquist 1916 called the process whereby metamorphic rocks are transformed into granulite ‘anatexis’.

The segregation of melt during the prograde part of the metamorphic history (temperature > solidus) involves separating the melt fraction from the residuum, which higher specific gravity causes to accumulate at a lower level. The subsequent migration of anatectic melt flows down local pressure gradients with little or no crystallization. The network of channels through which the melt moved at this stage may be lost by compression of the melanosome, leaving isolated lenses of leucosome. The melt product gathers in an underlying channel where it becomes subject to differentiation. Conduction is the principal mechanism of heat transfer in the continental crust; where shallow layers have been exhumed or buried rapidly there is a corresponding inflection in the geothermal gradient. Cooling due to surface exposure is conducted very slowly to deeper rocks so the deeper crust is slow to heat up and slow to cool. Numerical models of crustal heating confirm slow cooling in the deep crust. Therefore, once formed, anatectic melt can exist in the middle and lower crust for a very long period of time. It is squeezed laterally to form sills, laccolithic and lopolithic structures of mobile granulite at depths of c. 10–20 km. In outcrop today only stages of this process arrested during its initial rapid uplift are visible. Wherever the resulting fractionated granulite rises steeply in the crust, water exits from its supercriticality phase, the granulite starts to crystallize, becomes firstly fractionated melt + crystals, then solid rock, whilst still at the conditions of temperature and pressure existing beyond 8 km. Water, carbon dioxide, sulphur dioxide and other elements are exsolved under great pressure from the melt as it exits from supercritical conditions. These components rise rapidly towards the surface and contribute to formation of mineral deposits, volcanoes, mud volcanoes, geysers and hot springs.

== Color-banded migmatites ==
A leucosome is the lightest-colored part of migmatite. The melanosome is the darker part, and occurs between two leucosomes or, if remnants of the more or less unmodified parent rock (mesosome) are still present, it is arranged in rims around these remnants. When present, the mesosome is intermediate in color between leucosome and melanosome.

The melanosome is a dark, mafic mineral band formed in migmatite which is melting into a eutaxitic texture; often, this leads to the formation of granite. The melanosomes form bands with leucosomes, and in that context may be described as schlieren (color banding) or migmatitic.

== Migmatite textures ==
Migmatite textures are the product of thermal softening of the metamorphic rocks. Schlieren textures are a particularly common example of granite formation in migmatites, and are often seen in restite xenoliths and around the margins of S-type granites.

Ptygmatic folds are formed by highly plastic ductile deformation of the gneissic banding, and thus have little or no relationship to a defined foliation, unlike most regular folds. Ptygmatic folds can occur restricted to compositional zones of the migmatite, for instance in fine-grained shale protoliths versus in coarse granoblastic sandy protolith.

When a rock undergoes partial melting some minerals will melt (neosome, i.e. newly formed), while others remain solid (paleosome, i.e. older formation). The neosome is composed of lightly colored areas (leucosome) and dark areas (melanosome). The leucosome lies in the center of the layers and is mainly composed of quartz and feldspar. The melanosome is composed of cordierite, hornblende and biotite and forms the wall zones of the neosome.

== Early history of migmatite investigations ==
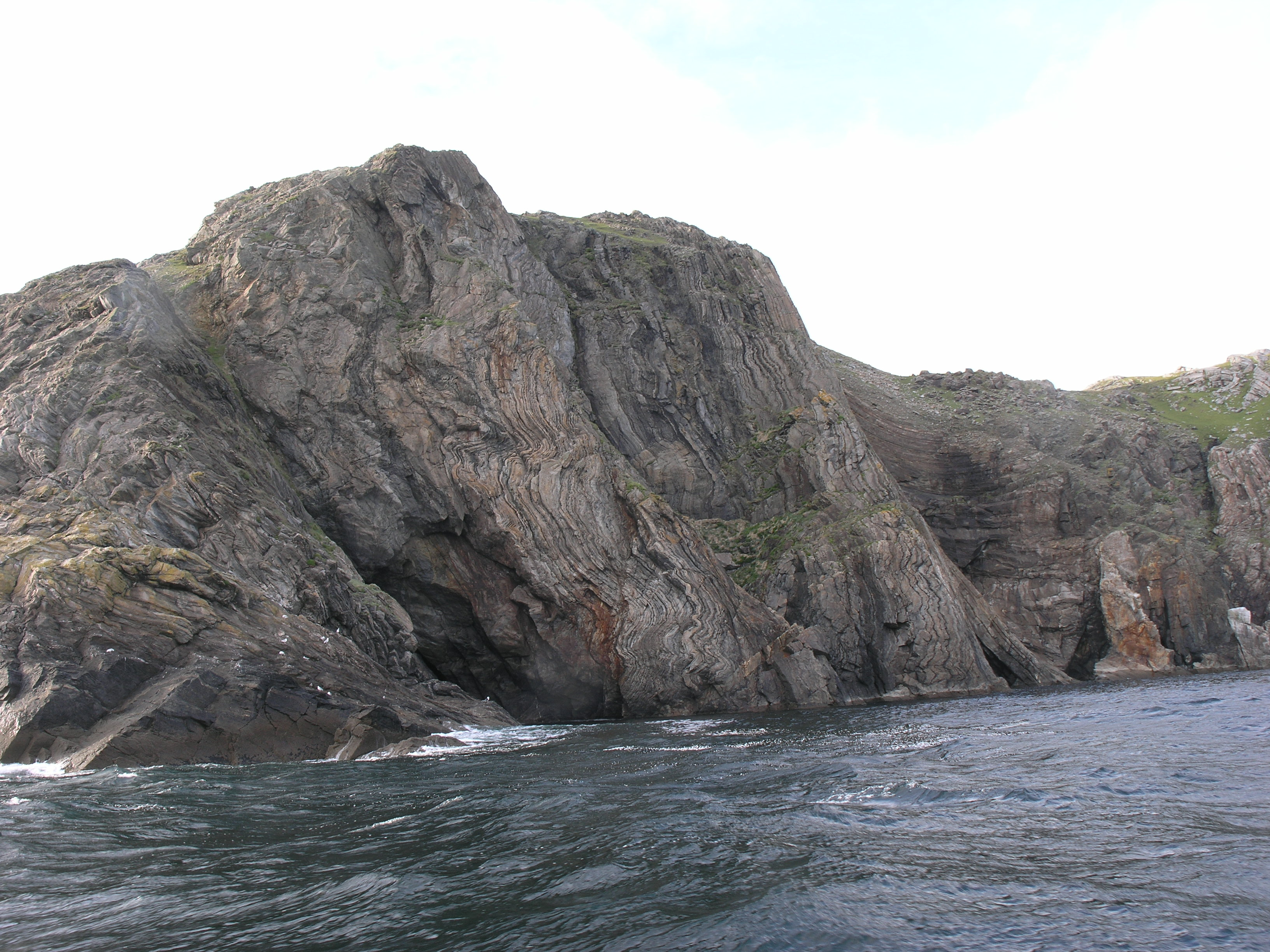
Cliff section through near-vertically dipping ptygmatically folded migmatites. Dalradian sequence south of Teelin, County Donegal, Ireland.

In 1795 James Hutton made some of the earliest comments on the relationship between gneiss and granite: “If granite be truly stratified, and those strata connected with the other strata of the earth, it can have no claim to originality; and the idea of primitive mountains, of late so much employed by natural philosophers, must vanish, in a more extensive view of the operations of the globe; but it is certain that granite, or a species of the same kind of stone, is thus found stratified. It is the granit feuilletée of M. de Saussure, and, if I mistake not, what is called gneis by the Germans.” The minute penetration of gneiss, schists and sedimentary deposits altered by contact-metamorphism, alternating with granitic materials along the planes of schistosity was described by Michel-Lévy, in his 1887 paper ' Sur l'Origine des Terrains Cristallins Primitifs'. He makes the following observations: “I first drew attention to the phenomenon of intimate penetration, ‘lit par lit’ of eruptive granitic and granulitic rocks that follow the schistosity planes of gneisses and schists ... But in between, in the contact zones Immediately above eruptive rock, quartz and feldspars insert themselves, bed by bed, between the leaves of the micaceous shales; it started from a detrital shale, now we find it definitively transformed into a recent gneiss, very difficult to distinguish from ancient gneiss”.

The coincidence of schistosity with bedding gave rise to the proposals of static or load metamorphism, advanced in 1889 by John Judd and others. In 1894 L. Milch recognized vertical pressure due to the weight of the overlying load to be the controlling factor. In 1896 Home and Greenly agreed that granitic intrusions are closely associated with metamorphic processes " the cause which brought about the introduction of the granite also resulted in these high and peculiar types of crystallization ". A later paper of Edward Greenly in 1903 described the formation of granitic gneisses by solid diffusion, and ascribed the mechanism of lit-par-lit occurrence to the same process. Greenly drew attention to thin and regular seams of injected material, which indicated that these operations took place in hot rocks; also to undisturbed septa of country rocks, which suggested that the expression of the magma occurred by quiet diffusion rather than by forcible injection. In 1907 Sederholm called the migmatite-forming process palingenesis. and (although it specifically included partial melting and dissolution) he considered magma injection and its associated veined and brecciated rocks as fundamental to the process. The upward succession of gneiss, schist and phyllite in the Central European Urgebirge influenced Ulrich Grubenmann in 1910 in his formulation of three depth-zones of metamorphism.

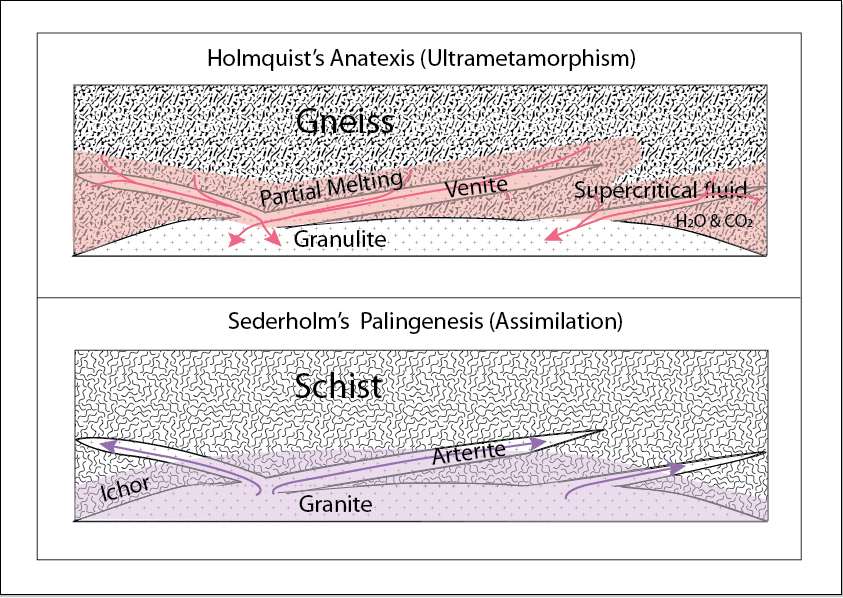
Comparison between anatexis and palingenesis interpretations of migmatite relationship with granulite

Holmquist found high-grade gneisses that contained many small patches and veins of granitic material. Granites were absent nearby, so he interpreted the patches and veins to be collection sites for partial melt exuded from the mica-rich parts of the host gneiss. Holmquist gave these migmatites the name ‘venite’ to emphasize their internal origin and to distinguish them from Sederholm's ‘arterites’. Which also contained veins of injected material. Sederholm later placed more emphasis on the roles of assimilation and the actions of fluids in the formation of migmatites and used the term ‘ichor’, to describe them.

Persuaded by the close connection between migmatization and granites in outcrop, Sederholm considered migmatites to be an intermediary between igneous and metamorphic rocks. He thought that the granitic partings in banded gneisses originated through the agency of either melt or a nebulous fluid, the ichor, both derived from nearby granites. An opposing view, proposed by Holmquist, was that the granitic material came from the adjacent country rock, not the granites, and that it was segregated by fluid transport. Holmquist believed that such replacive migmatites were produced during metamorphism at a relatively low metamorphic grade, with partial melting only intervening at high grade. Thus, the modern view of migmatites corresponds closely to Holmquist's concept of ultrametamorphism, and to Sederholm's concept of anatexis, but is far from the concept of palingenesis, or the various metasomatic and subsolidus processes proposed during the granitization debate. Read considered that regionally metamorphosed rocks resulted from the passage of waves or fronts of metasomatizing solutions out from the central granitization core, above which arise the zones of metamorphism.

== Agmatite ==
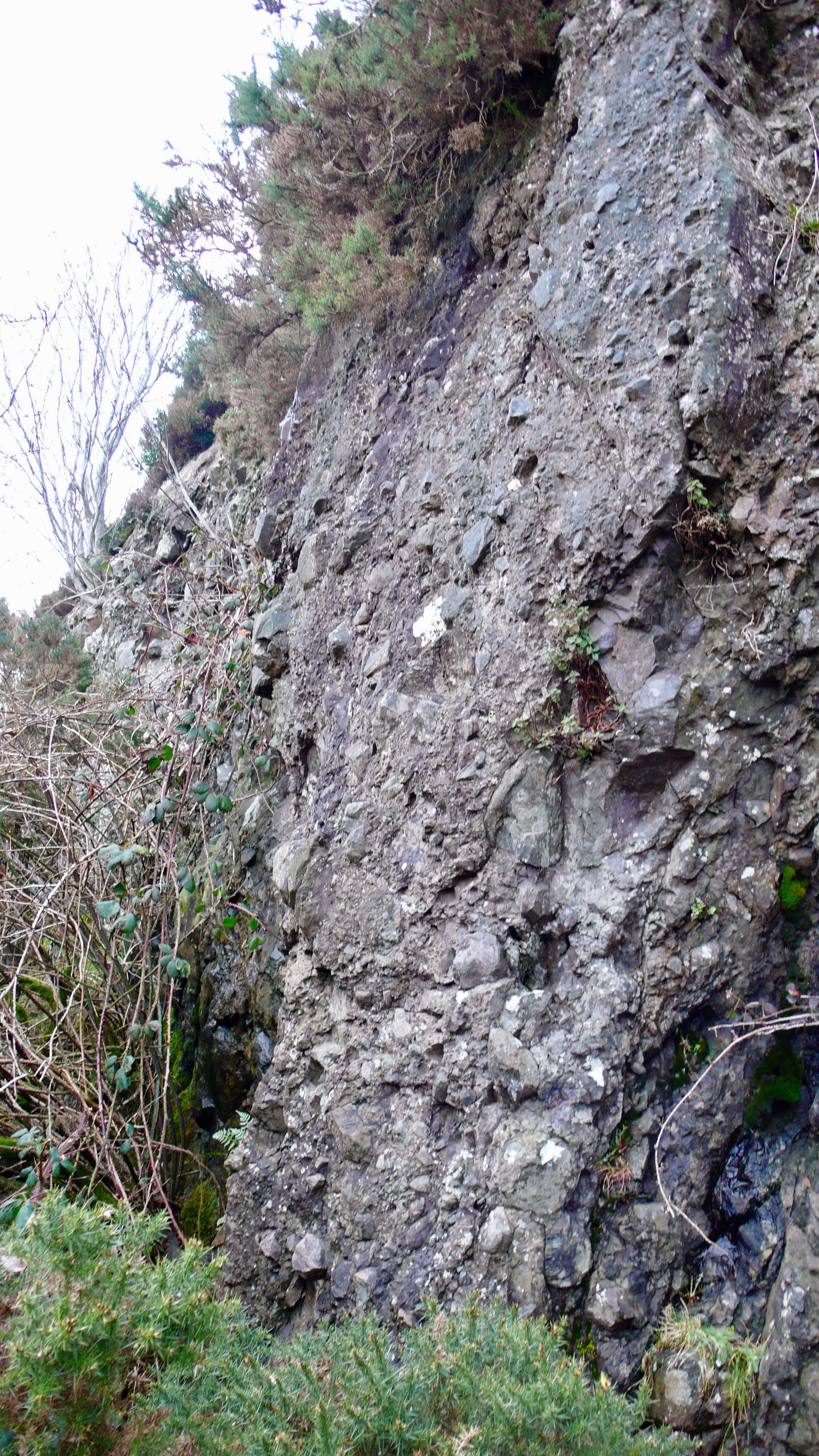
Intrusion breccia dyke at Goladoo, Co. Donegal, Ireland

The original name for this phenomenon was defined by Sederholm (1923) as a rock with "fragments of older rock cemented by granite", and was regarded by him to be a type of migmatite. There is a close connection between migmatites and the occurrence of ‘explosion breccias’ in schists and phyllites adjacent to diorite and granite intrusions. Rocks matching this description can also be found around igneous intrusive bodies in low-grade or unmetamorphosed country-rocks. Brown (1973) argued that agmatites are not migmatites, and should be called ‘intrusion breccias’ or ‘vent agglomerates’. Reynolds (1951) thought the term ‘agmatite’ ought to be abandoned.

== Migmatite melts provide buoyancy for sedimentary isostasy ==
Recent geochronological studies from granulite-facies metamorphic terranes (e.g. Willigers et al. 2001) show that metamorphic temperatures remained above the granite solidus for between 30 and 50 My. This suggests that once formed, anatectic melt can exist in the middle and lower crust for a very long period of time. The resulting granulite is free to move laterally and up along weaknesses in the overburden in directions determined by the pressure gradient.

In areas where it lies beneath a deepening sedimentary basin, a portion of granulite melt will tend to move laterally beneath the base of previously metamorphosed rocks that have not yet reached the migmatic stage of anatexis. It will congregate in areas where pressure is lower. The melt will lose its volatile content when it reaches a level where temperature and pressure is less than the supercritical water phase boundary. The melt will crystallize at that level and prevent following melt from reaching that level until persistent following magma pressure pushes the overburden upwards.

== Other migmatite hypotheses ==
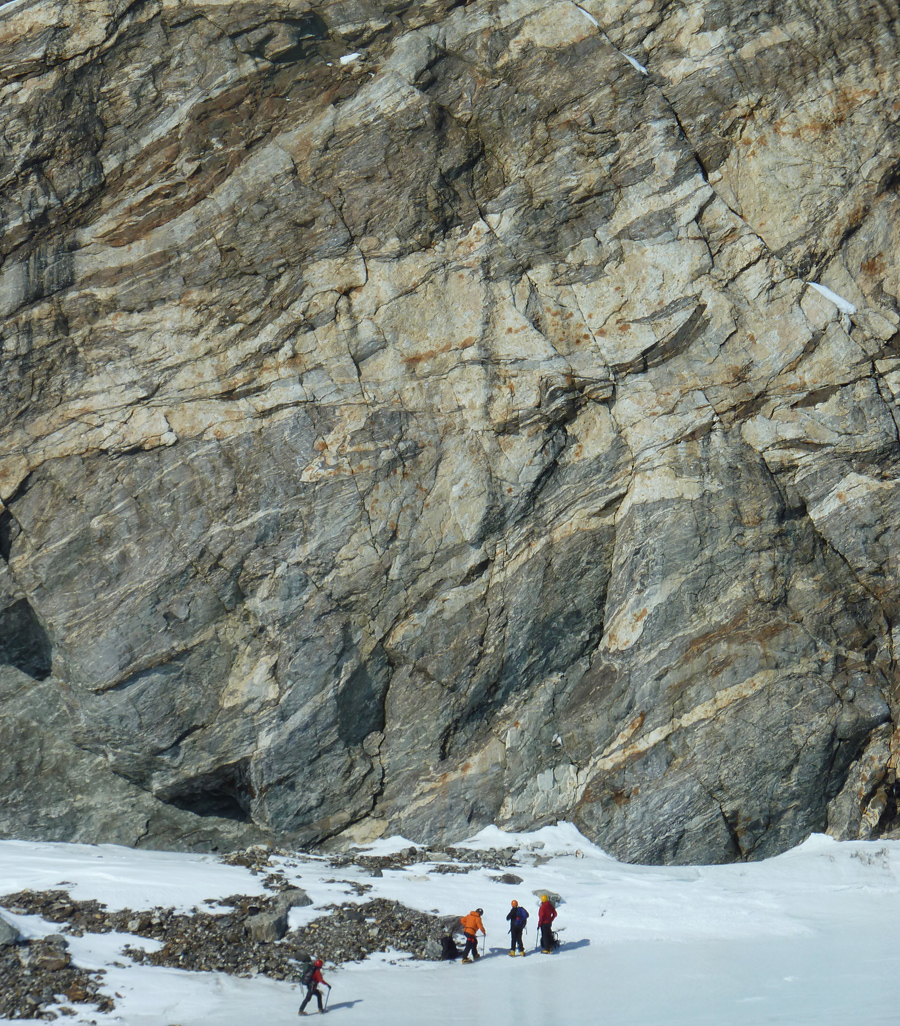
Migmatite at Maigetter Peak, Fosdick Mountains, West Antarctica

For migmatised argillaceous rocks, the partial or fractional melting would first produce a volatile and incompatible-element enriched rich partial melt of granitic composition. Such granites derived from sedimentary rock protoliths would be termed S-type granite, are typically potassic, sometimes containing leucite, and would be termed adamellite, granite and syenite. Volcanic equivalents would be rhyolite and rhyodacite.

Migmatised igneous or lower-crustal rocks which melt do so to form a similar granitic I-type granite melt, but with distinct geochemical signatures and typically plagioclase dominant mineralogy forming monzonite, tonalite and granodiorite compositions. Volcanic equivalents would be dacite and trachyte.

It is difficult to melt mafic metamorphic rocks except in the lower mantle, so it is rare to see migmatitic textures in such rocks. However, eclogite and granulite are roughly equivalent mafic rocks.

== Etymology ==
The Finnish petrologist Jakob Sederholm first used the term in 1907 for rocks within the Scandinavian craton in southern Finland. The term was derived from the Greek word μιγμα: migma, meaning a mixture.

== See also ==
- Anatexis – Partial melting of rocks
- List of rock textures – List of rock textural and morphological terms
- Migmatitovaya Rock – Rock formation in Queen Maud land, Antarctica
- Rock microstructure – Relationship between materials which compose a rock
