= Laura Hezner =

German geologist (1862–1916)

Laura Hezner (15 September 1862 – 10 October 1916) was a German geologist. She was one of the first two women at ETH Zurich in Switzerland to earn a doctorate and the first to receive her habilitation there. Later, she was hired by the university as the first female lecturer in chemical mineralogy and petrography.

== Biography ==
Laura Hezner was born on 15 September 1862 in Apfelthal, Bavaria, Germany, into a family of railway engineers. The second of five children, she attended the convent school in Sigmaringen, Germany. Her mother died when she was 12 years old. Under the care of her aunt in Munich, she completed her studies at the School of Applied Arts and her training as a French teacher. Later, when her older sister married, Laura took over management of the household for her father and three younger siblings while pursuing her own studies. At the suggestion of a young female student, she enrolled as a student in Zurich, Switzerland. In 1898, at the age of 36, she officially began studying ethnology but then switched to the natural sciences department of the Swiss Federal Institute of Technology. She graduated with distinction in 1901 and subsequently earned her doctorate, completing her dissertation in 1903. Her doctoral thesis was titled, "A contribution to the knowledge of eclogites and amphibolites with special consideration of the occurrences in the middle Ötztal" and was 110 pages long. Her advisor, Ulrich Grubenmann, a renowned mineralogist and petrographer, said that her habilitation thesis was "the crowning achievement."

=== Lecturer ===
As the first female lecturer at ETH Zurich (Eidgenössische Technische Hochschule Zürich), she went to work as Grubenmann's assistant, and he subtly managed to get her a few raises in pay over the years. When he became director and later rector, he championed Laura Hezner's academic advancements. She received her habilitation in 1910 and subsequently worked as a private lecturer. Paul Niggli, who studied at ETH Zurich during her time and co-authored papers with Grubenmann, described her as a particularly objective and focused researcher.

Hezner gained recognition for her studies of eclogites from the Austrian Alps. She compared the mineralogical characteristics of eclogites to amphibolites (rocks primarily composed of hornblende and plagioclase), and concluded that the variations are "due to differences in formation depth and pressure."

Laura Hezner died from orbital cancer on 10 October 1916 at 53. In his obituary, Grubenmann described her as an "exemplary, quiet researcher."

=== Selected honors ===
A street on the ETH campus is named Laura Hezner Way.

== Selected works ==
- Hezner, Laura. "Ein Beitrag zur Kenntnis der Eklogite und Amphibolite." Tschermaks mineralogische und petrographische Mitteilungen 22, no. 5 (1903): 437-471.
- Hezner, Laura. Ein beitrag zur kenntnis des Eklogite und Amphibolite mit besonderer berücksichtigung der vorkommisse des mittleren Ötztales. A. Hölder, 1903.
- Hezner, Laura. Petrographische Untersuchung der kristallinen Schiefer auf der Südseite des St. Gotthard'(Tremolaserie)'. Schweizerbart, 1908.
- Hezner, Laura. Der Peridotit von Loderio:(Kt. Tessin). Zürcher u. Furrer Dr, 1909.
