= A-type granite =

Subtype of granite formed in anorogenic or anhydrous conditions

A-type granite is a particular category of the S-I-A-M or 'alphabet' system which classifies granitoids and granitic rock by their protoliths or source. The 'A' stands for Anorogenic or Anhydrous, as these granites are characterized by low water content and a lack of orogenic or transitional tectonic fabric. Other SIAM categories are S, I, and M types.

== Alphabet Classification System ==
In mid 1970's Chappell and White established 2 fundamentally distinctive types of granite: rocks with attributes that could be derived from metasedimentary rock, "S-type" granites and those whose attributes derived from metaigneous rock, "I-type" granites. The addition of the A-type granitoids was proposed by Loiselle and Wones in 1979 however this type was based on tectonic regime and geochemical characteristics. The later M-type granitoids were based on their mantle-sourced protoliths and of having particular chemical characteristics.

== Occurrence ==
The A-type granites dominantly form within continental intraplate rifting or uplifting or at regional post-orogeny uplift or collapse. Their formation could be either anorogenic, meaning far from any orogeny, or after orogeny is completed.

== Geochemistry ==
Chemical characteristics of A-type granites include high silica, alkalis, zirconium, niobium, gallium, yttrium and cerium. The ratio of gallium to aluminium is high, as is the ratio of iron to magnesium. There are lower levels of calcium and strontium. By using Ga/Al ratio, fractionated felsic I- or S-type granites can overlap in apparent composition. Enriched alkalis include sodium, potassium, rubidium and caesium. Other depleted elements include barium, phosphorus, titanium and europium.

== Subtypes ==
Subtypes include A_{1}, anorogenic, derived from ocean island basalt; and A_{2} post-orogenic, derived by crustal melting or crust and mantle mixing.

== Sources ==
The source could be dry granulite left over from the loss of wet magma during orogenies.
