= I-type granite =

Subclass of granite formed from igneous protoliths

I-type granites are a category of granites originating from igneous sources, first proposed by Chappell and White (1974). They are recognized by a specific set of mineralogical, geochemical, textural, and isotopic characteristics that indicate, for example, magma hybridization in the deep crust. I-type granites are saturated in silica but undersaturated in aluminum; petrographic features are representative of the chemical composition of the initial magma. In contrast S-type granites are derived from partial melting of supracrustal or "sedimentary" source rocks.

== Petrographic characteristics ==
=== Primary minerals ===
Minerals that crystallized from the silicate melt are considered primary minerals. They are grouped into "Major", "Minor", and "Accessory" minerals based upon their modal percentages in the rock.

=== Major mineralogy ===
Primary minerals in I-type granites are plagioclase, potassium feldspar, and quartz as in S- and A-type granites. I-type granites have less quartz then their S-type granite color index equivalents. Plagioclase displays zonation and albite twinning. Potassium feldspar can show perthite textures, carlsbad twinning, and, in microcline, tartan twinning. Quartz and potassium feldspar scarcely show granophyric textures.

=== Minor minerals ===
Biotite is the most common minor mineral in I-type granites. The biotites in I-type granites are greener in general than those in S-type, both in hand sample and in plane polarized light. More mafic composition granites, those with a higher color index, contain more hornblende and biotite. Hornblende is a typical I-type granite mineral which never occurs in S-type granite. Hornblende crystals can be twinned and compositionally zoned.

=== Accessory minerals ===
Zircon and apatite can occur in both I- and S-type granites, whereas titanite (sphene) and allanite are considered diagnostic accessory minerals for I-type granites. Allanite is typically surrounded by radial fractures, caused by the subsolidus increase in volume of allanite as a result of metamict alteration due to radioactive decay. While apatite inclusions are common, they are not as abundant or large as those in S-Type granites. Primary muscovite can occur in weakly peraluminous fractionated I-type granites. Therefore, the presence of muscovite alone is not diagnostic of S-type granites.

=== Subsolidus and alteration minerals ===
Minerals that form in the rock as a result of chemical reactions that take place between primary minerals and hydrothermal fluids are classified as subsolidus minerals. They form below the temperature and pressure conditions of the solidus in the absence of a silicate melt. Other alteration minerals may form at surface conditions from interaction of the minerals present in the rock with groundwater and the atmosphere.

Alteration of biotites can produce fluorite, chlorite, and iron oxides such as magnetite and ilmenite. Sericitic alteration is seen within feldspars. In more evolved I-Type granites, calcite occurs as a late stage and/or a subsolidus mineral. Fluorite, like calcite, is rare and where observed it is associated with the more evolved I-type granites. It can form as a late stage product of crystallization. It is commonly observed as part of the subsolidus alteration of biotite along with chlorite and opaque oxides. Muscovite occurs as an alteration of feldspars and biotite. Epidote can be found, especially on the edges of allanite.

=== Color index ===
Color index, or the modal abundance of minerals other than quartz, plagioclase and alkali feldspar (e.g., mafic silicates, oxides, sulfides, phosphates, etc.), can be used to infer the maturity of a granite. Juvenile I-type granites have a higher color index. Amphibole, biotite, sphene, allanite, and oxides are typically more abundant. In contrast, more evolved (i.e. fractionated) I-type granites have a lower color index, and may contain minerals such as muscovite that are indicative of their fractionated nature.

=== Textures ===
I-type granites can have variable textures. I-type granites, like other granite types, can vary in crystal size from aphanitic to phaneritic; crystal size distributions include porphyritic, seriate, and rarely equigranular textures. Like other granites, phenocrysts in I-type granites are commonly feldspars, but can also be hornblende. Amphibole is a diagnostic feature on the hand sample scale between S-type and I-type granites.

== Geochemistry ==
=== Major elements ===
I-type granites are rich in silica, calcium and sodium but contain lesser amounts of aluminium and potassium when compared to S-type granites. I-type granites are typically metaluminous to weakly peraluminous. This is expressed mineralogically by the presence of amphibole and accessory minerals such as sphene and allanite in the metaluminous I-type granites. Note that weakly peraluminous fractionated I-type granites may crystallize primary muscovite and rare spessartine-rich garnet.

=== Trace and rare earth elements ===
The rare earth element diagrams of I-type granite suites tend to be flatter than those of S-type granites, which has been inferred to be caused by the lesser amounts of apatite in I-type granites. I-type granites have lower rubidium/strontium (Rb/Sr) ratios than S-type granites.

=== Isotopic characteristics ===
Initial strontium isotopic ratios (^{87}Sr/^{86}Sr)_{i} are a good differentiator between I- and S-type granites, with I-type granites having lower initial strontium isotopic ratios than S-type granites.

== Interpretation(s) ==
=== Source characteristics ===
I-type granites are interpreted to be generated from the melting of igneous rocks. The “I” in I-type in fact stands for igneous. This interpretation was made by Chappell and White in their 1974 paper based on their observations in the Lachlan Fold belt of southeastern Australia.

=== The I-S line ===
The I-S line is an observed contact between I- and S-type granites in an igneous terrane. This contact is usually clearly defined; one example of this occurring is within the Lachlan fold belt of Australia. The I-S line is interpreted to be the location of a paleo-structure in the subsurface that separated the generation zones of the two different melts.

=== Suites and supersuites ===
Granite plutons can be grouped into suites and super suites by their source regions, which in turn are interpreted by comparing their compositions. This interpretation comes from the plotting of different element concentrations against the level of evolution of the granite, usually as percent silica or its magnesium to iron ratio. Igneous rocks with the same source region will plot along a line in silica to element space.

=== Restite unmixing ===
Granites traced to the same source region can often have very variable mineralogy; color index for example can vary greatly within the same batholith. In addition, many minerals resist melting and would not melt at the temperatures known to create the magmas that form I-type granites. One model that explains this mineralogic anomaly is restite unmixing. In this model, minerals that are resistant to melting, such as the color index minerals, do not melt but are rather brought up by the melt in solid state. Melts that are farther from their source regions would therefore contain fewer color index minerals, while those closer to their source regions would have a higher color index. This model supplements the models of partial melting and fractional crystallization.

=== Other models ===
Other models include magma mixing, crustal assimilation, and source region mixing. More recent studies have shown that the source regions of I-type and S-type magmas cannot be homogeneously igneous or sedimentary, respectively. Instead, many magmas show signs of being sourced from a combination of source materials. These magmas can be characterized by having a series of neodymium and hafnium isotope characteristics that can be thought of as a combination of both I- and S-type isotopic characteristics. Magma mixing is another aspect of granite formation that must be taken into account when observing granites. Magma mixing occurs when magmas of a different composition intrude a larger magma body. In some cases, the melts are immiscible and stay separated to form pillow like collections of denser mafic magmas on the bottom of less dense dense felsic magma chambers. The mafic pillow basalts will demonstrate a felsic matrix, suggesting magma mingling. Alternatively, the melts mix together and form a magma of a composition intermediate to the intrusive and intruded melt.
