= Ulrich Grubenmann =

Swiss mineralogist and petrologist

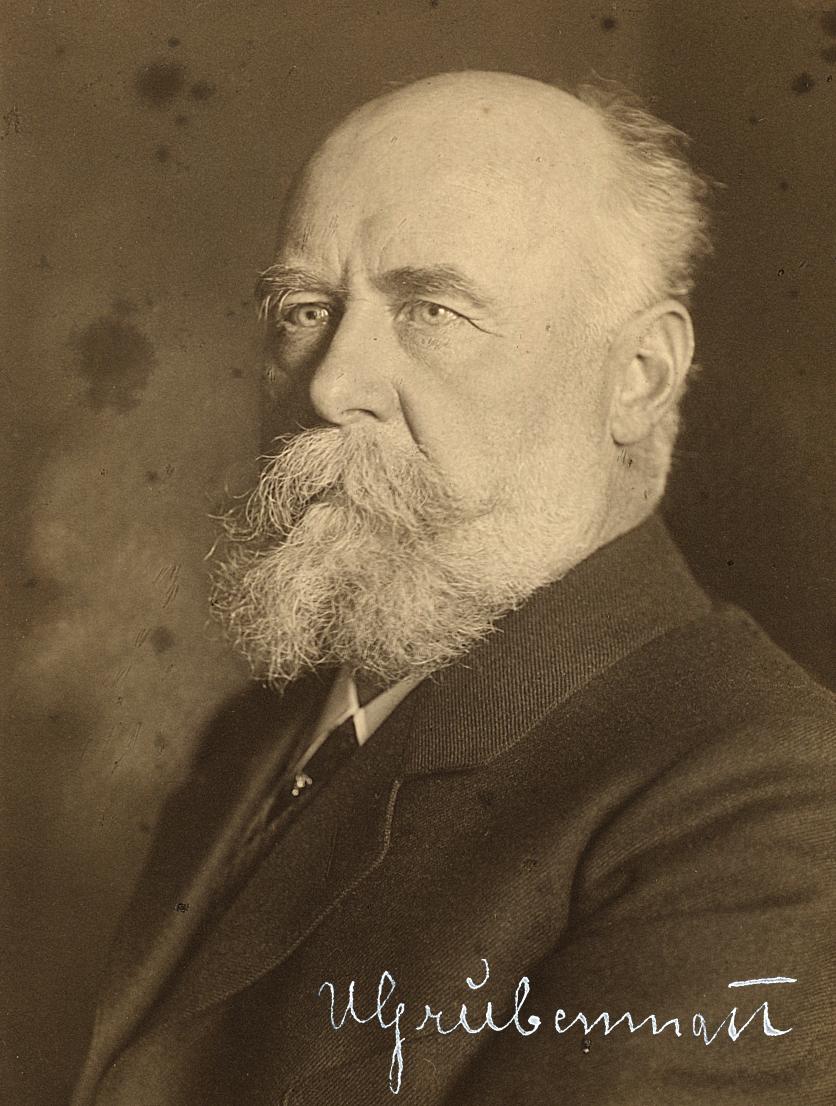

Johann Ulrich Grubenmann (15 April 1850 – 16 March 1924) was a Swiss mineralogist and petrologist who served as professor of geology at the Swiss Federal Institute of Technology (now ETH Zurich) . He studied metamorphism and produced an influential classification of metamorphic rocks.

== Life and work ==
Grubenmann was born in Trogen, Switzerland to baker Johann Kaspar Grubenmann and Katharina Eugster. His ancestors included the bridge-builder Johann Ulrich Grubenmann (1709-1783) who constructed a famous wooden bridge at Schaffhausen. Growing in a family of limited means, Grubenmann was able to study with scholarships and help from friends and became a certified teacher of natural sciences in 1874. He received a PhD for studies on the basalts of Hegau in 1886 from the University of Zurich. He then taught at the Swiss Federal Institute of Technology and at the Canton School in Frauenfeld. He became Privatdozent in 1888 and replaced Gustav Adolph Kenngott in 1897 as professor of mineralogy and petrography.

Grubenmann began his studies with descriptive mineralogy, shifting to petrography and examining metamorphism. He taught mineral analysis techniques which became valuable for students of geology, many of whom became involved in the search for oil, even though Grubenmann himself never took an interest in oil geology. Grubenmann founded the journal Schweizerische mineralogische und petrographische Mitteilungen which he edited from its beginning in 1921 until his death. He conducted field studies in the Swiss Alps, Hegau in Germany as well as in Italy. His main work on metamorphism was published along with his student Paul Niggli as Die Gesteinsmetamorphose in 1924. Based on pressure and temperature conditions during formation he proposed classification of metamorphic rocks.
