= S-type granite =

Category of granites

S-type granites are a category of granites first proposed in 1974. They are recognized by a specific set of mineralogical, geochemical, textural, and isotopic characteristics. S-type granites are over-saturated in aluminium, with an ASI index greater than 1.1 where ASI = Al_{2}O_{3} / (CaO + Na_{2}O +K_{2}O) in mol percent; petrographic features are representative of the chemical composition of the initial magma as originally put forth by Chappell and White are summarized in their table 1.

== Mineralogy ==
=== Major minerals (present in amounts > 5 volume%) ===
Like all granites, the modal mineralogy of S-type granites are dominated by alkali- and plagioclase feldspars and quartz. Thus, S-type granites are silica over-saturated (contain quartz), and do not contain feldspathoids. An interesting feature of S-type granites, at the hand sample scale, is that alkali-feldspars are typically white in color (rather than pink) excluding samples that have been affected by weathering and alteration. A photomicrograph, taken in cross-polarized light, of alkali feldspar from the S-type Strathbogie Granite of Australia is shown in figure 1.

Examples of granite textures and mineralogy as seen in sawn-slabs from hand samples collected from granites of the Lachlan Fold Belt, Australia are shown. This includes enclaves of dark, lineated, ovoid, metamorphic rocks in the S-type Cooma Granodiorite. These enclaves are considered to represent restite by some researchers and meta-sedimentary xenoliths by others. The S-type Granya Granite shows the characteristic white feldspars, grey quartz, and black biotite, the highly reflective mineral is muscovite. The S-type Strathbogie Granite crops out in the Strathbogie Ranges of Australia. A hand sample from the Strathbogie Granite has a porphyritic texture with larger crystal of grey quartz, called phenocrysts, set in a finer grain matrix of quartz and feldspar. The darker, prismatic, phenocrysts in this sample of the Strathbogie Granite are cordierite. Geologists use differences in mineralogy and texture, such as shown here, to subdivide large granite batholiths into subdomains on geological maps.

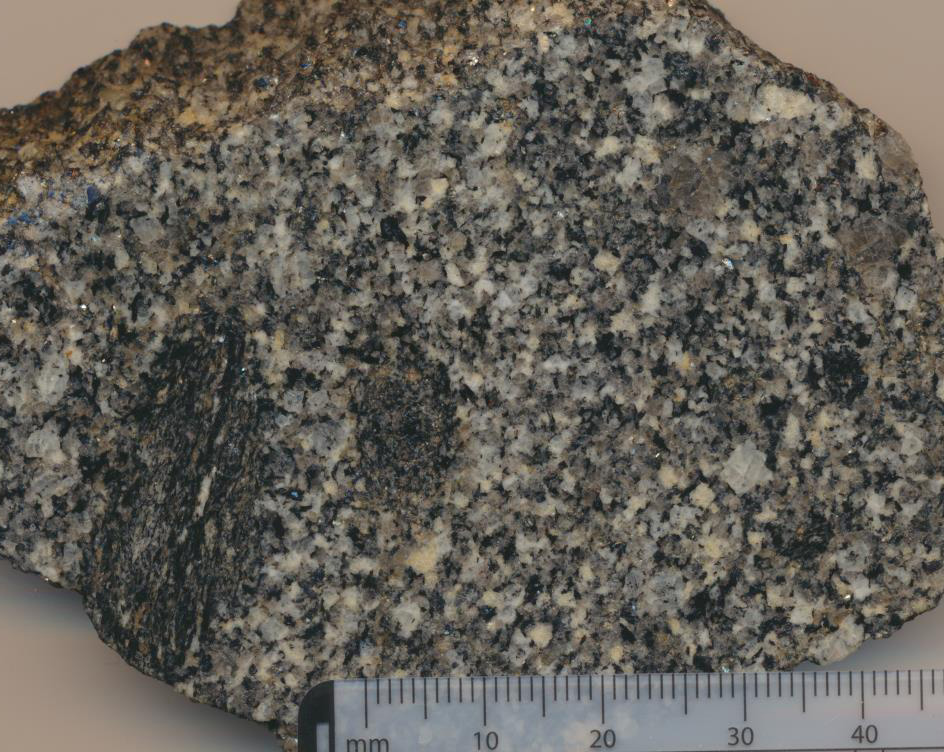
Hand sample of CC-1 from the S-type Cooma Granodiorite, Australia

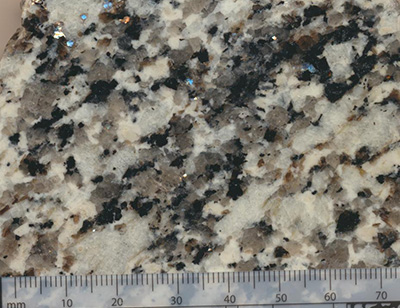
Hand sample of VB-140 from the S-type Granya Granite, Australia

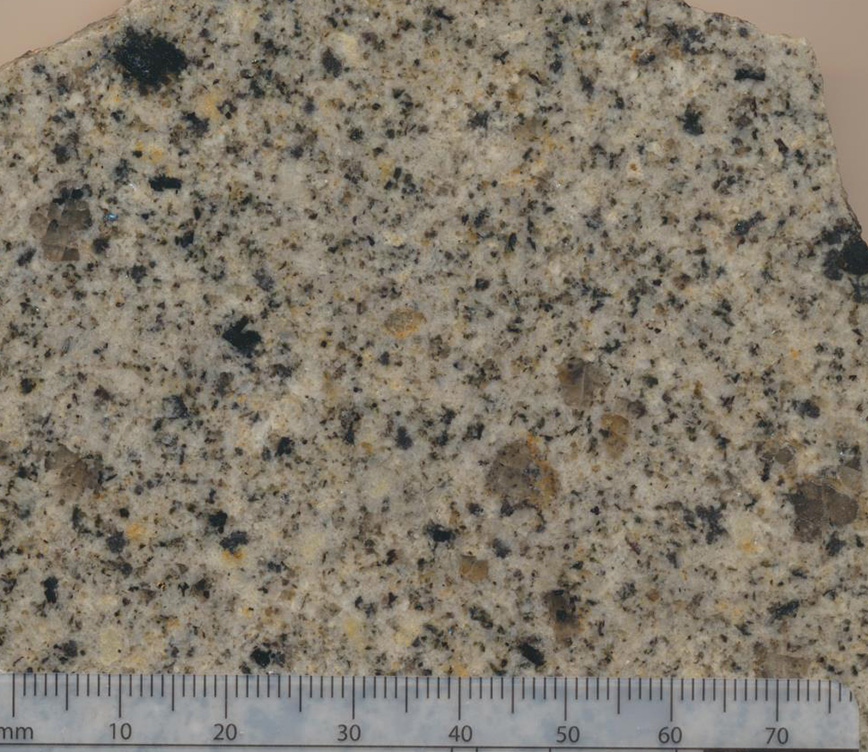
Hand sample of CV-114 S-type Strathbogie Granite, Australia

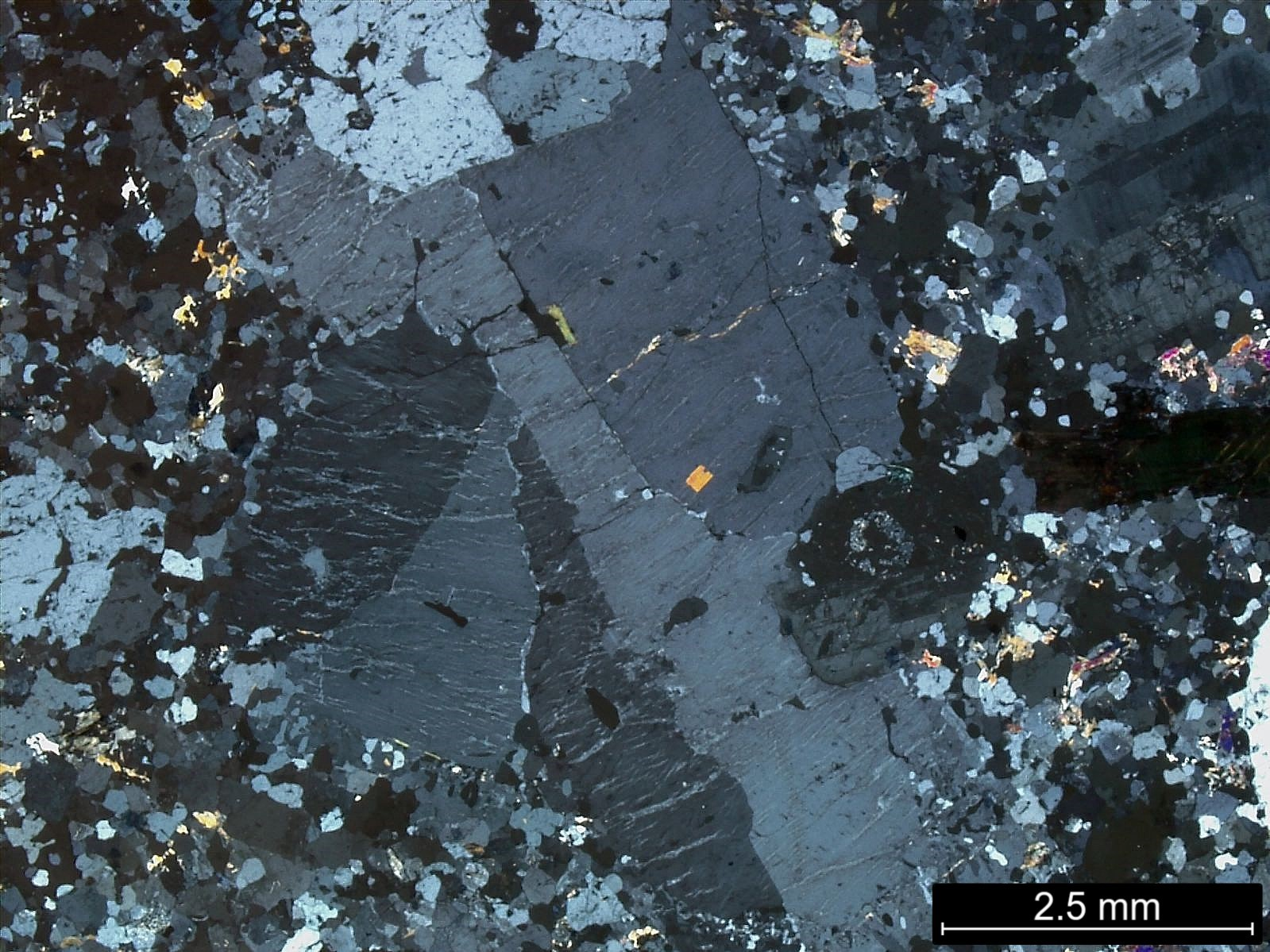
Figure 1. Photomicrograph of perthitic texture in alkali-feldspar (center) from the Strathbogie Granite, Australia. (Cross polarized light). Sample CV-114.

=== Characteristic minor minerals (present in amounts > 1% and < 5 volume%) ===
Minor minerals in S-type granites reflect the aluminium saturation or ASI Index of the rock being greater than 1.1 mol%. These minerals include cordierite, muscovite, garnet, and sillimanite. Within S-type volcanics, cordierite occurs in place of clinopyroxene. The presence of these aluminous silicate minerals are commonly used as a means of initially classifying granites as “S-type”. Photomicrographs of these minerals in thin section from S-type granites of the Lachlan Fold Belt are shown in figure 2a and 2b. S-type granites can also contain aluminium-rich, iron and magnesium rich biotites. Biotite compositions from S-type granites are more aluminous than those of I-type granites consistent with the higher ASI index of S-type granites.

Figures 3a and 3b are photomicrographs of thin sections of sample CC-1 from the Cooma Granodiorite, Lachlan Fold Belt, Australia.

In plane polarized light (PPL, Fig. 3a) the mineral biotite is light brown to "foxy" red brown with dark circular spots known as “pleochroic halos”. Muscovite is clear and sillimanite is the more acicular-fibrous mineral within the dark zone of the image. In cross polarized light (Fig. 3b) muscovite displays colorful birefringence and sillimanite is of the variety "fibrolite". Sillimanite is considered a diagnostic mineral for peraluminous S-type granites. Figure 4a and 4b, show the mineral cordierite, which is also considered to be a diagnostic mineral for peraluminous S-type granites in the Strathbogie Granite (sample CV-142). Subhedral cordierite phenocryst shown here is colorless in plane polarized light, but can display a light blue color in some minerals, and is grey in cross-polarized light. It is an orthorhombic mineral and displays a prismatic crystal form with imperfect cleavage.

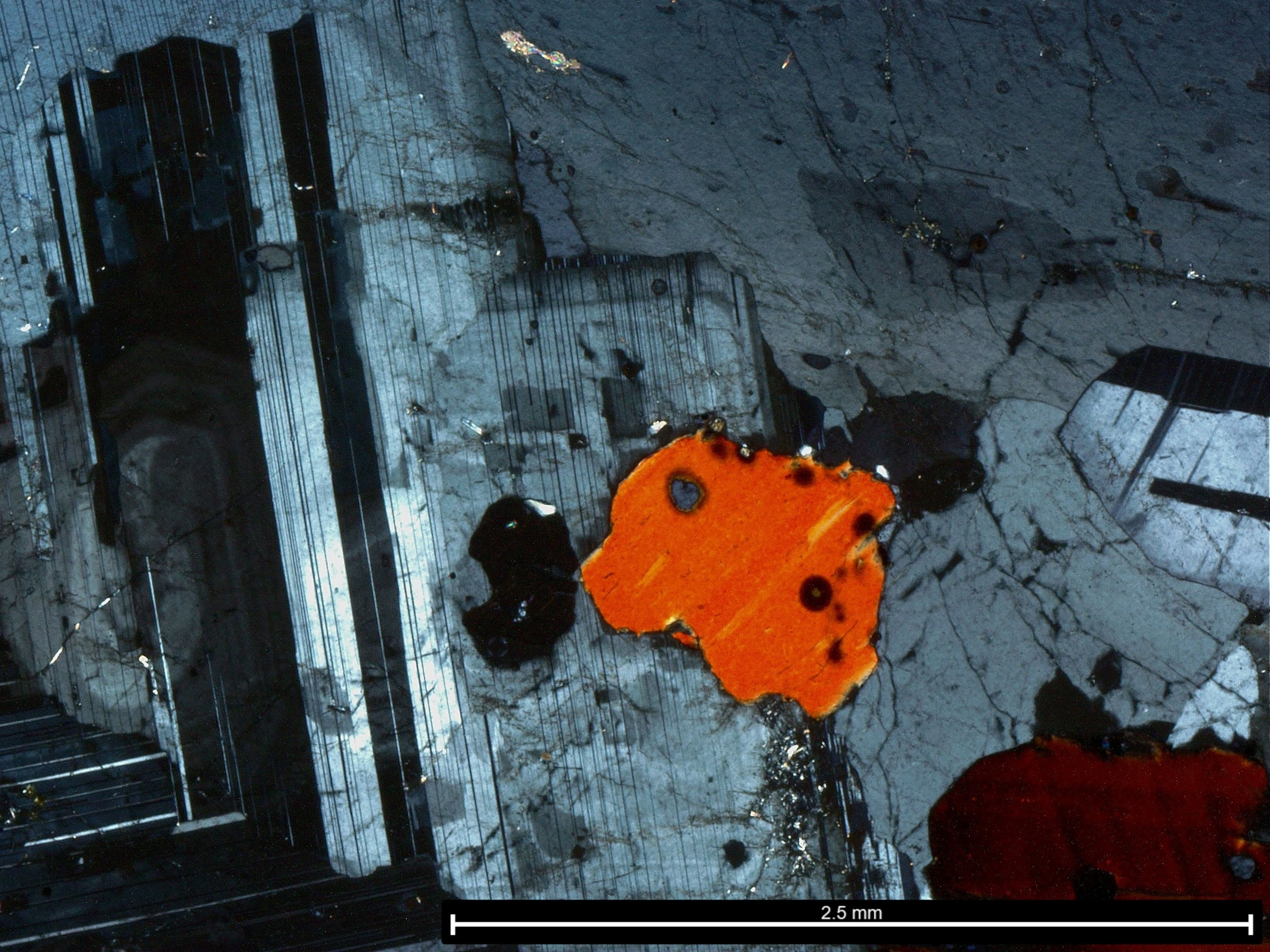
Figure 2a. Cross-polarized light photomicrograph showing garnet and biotite and plagioclase in the sample CV-126 from the mafic S-type Strathbogie Granite.

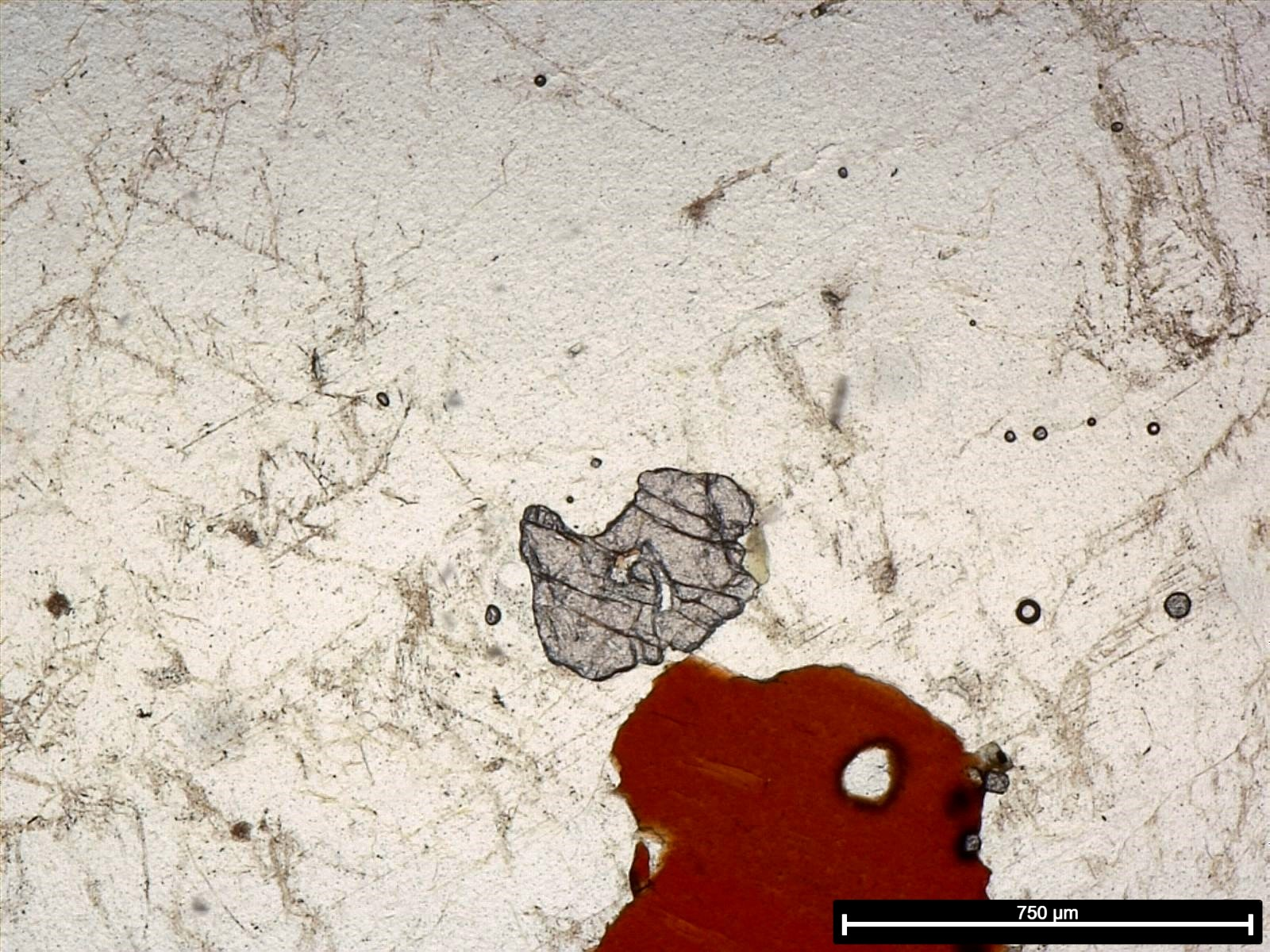
Figure 2b. Plane polarized light photomicrograph showing garnet and biotite in sample CV-126 from the mafic S-type Strathbogie Granite.

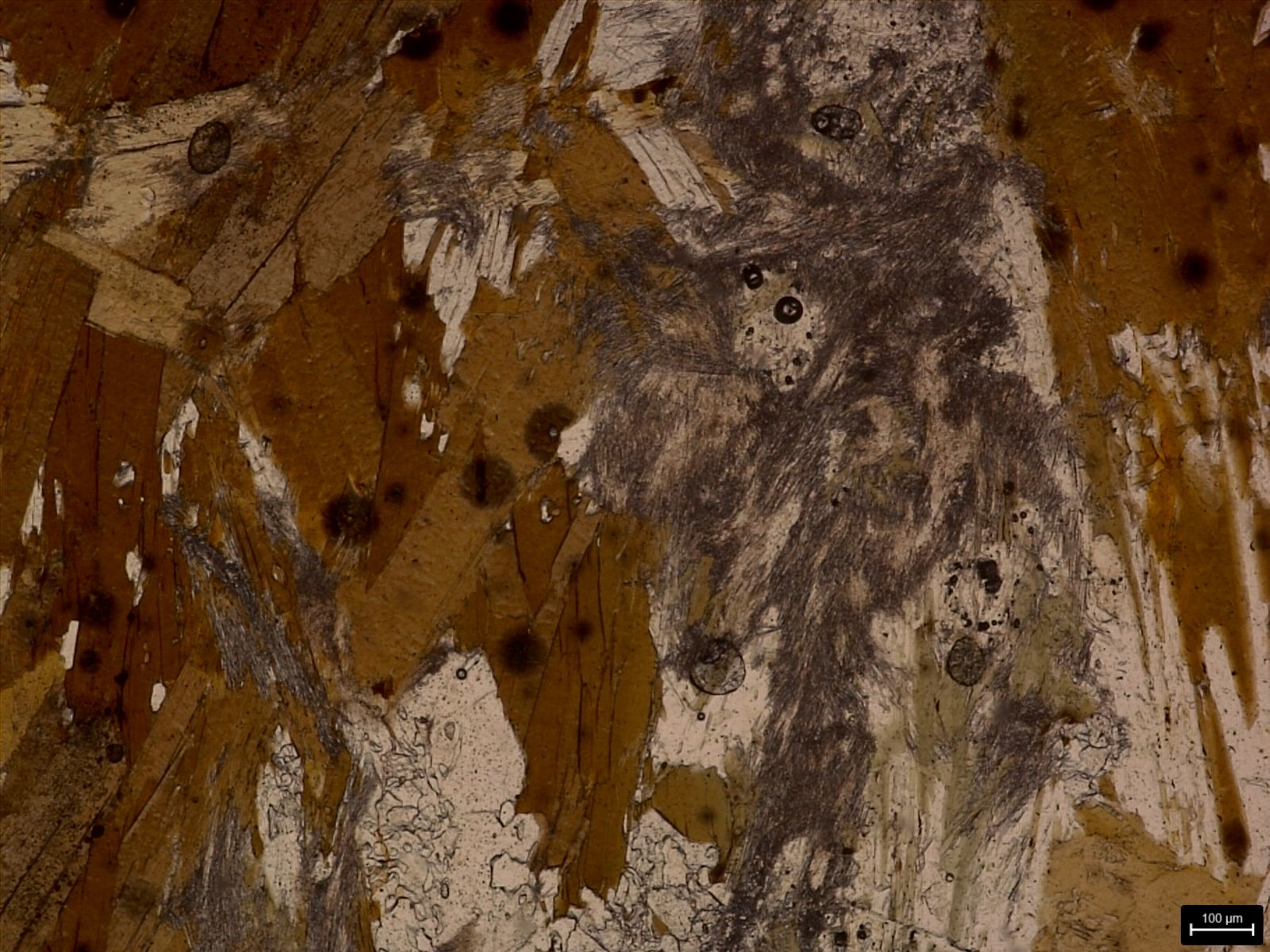
Figure 3a Plane polarized light photomicrograph showing the mineral Sillimanite surrounded by biotite and muscovite in sample CC-1 from the Cooma Granodiorite.

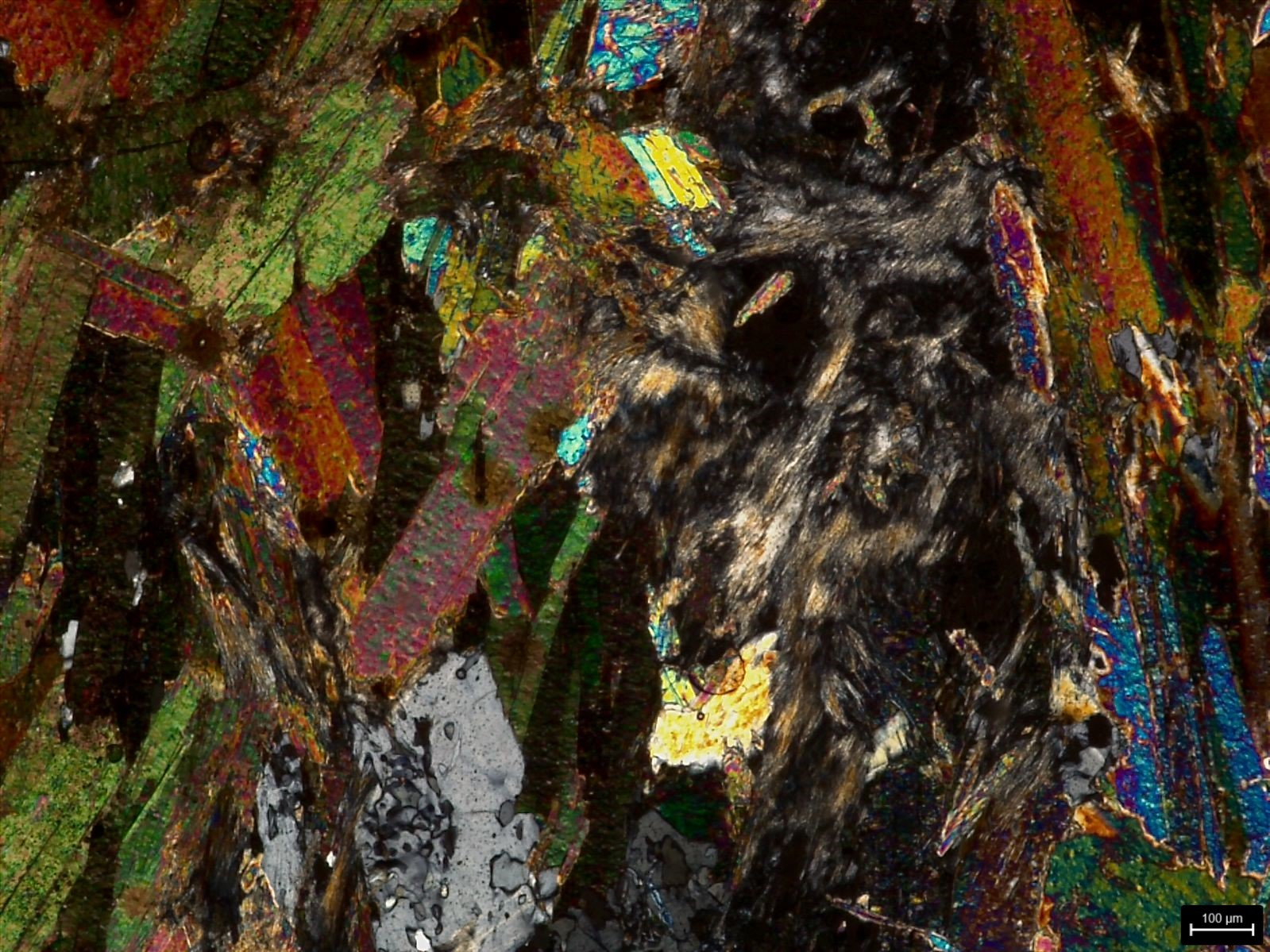
Figure 3b Cross polarized light photomicrograph showing the mineral Sillimanite surrounded by biotite and muscovite in sample CC-1 from the Cooma Granodiorite.

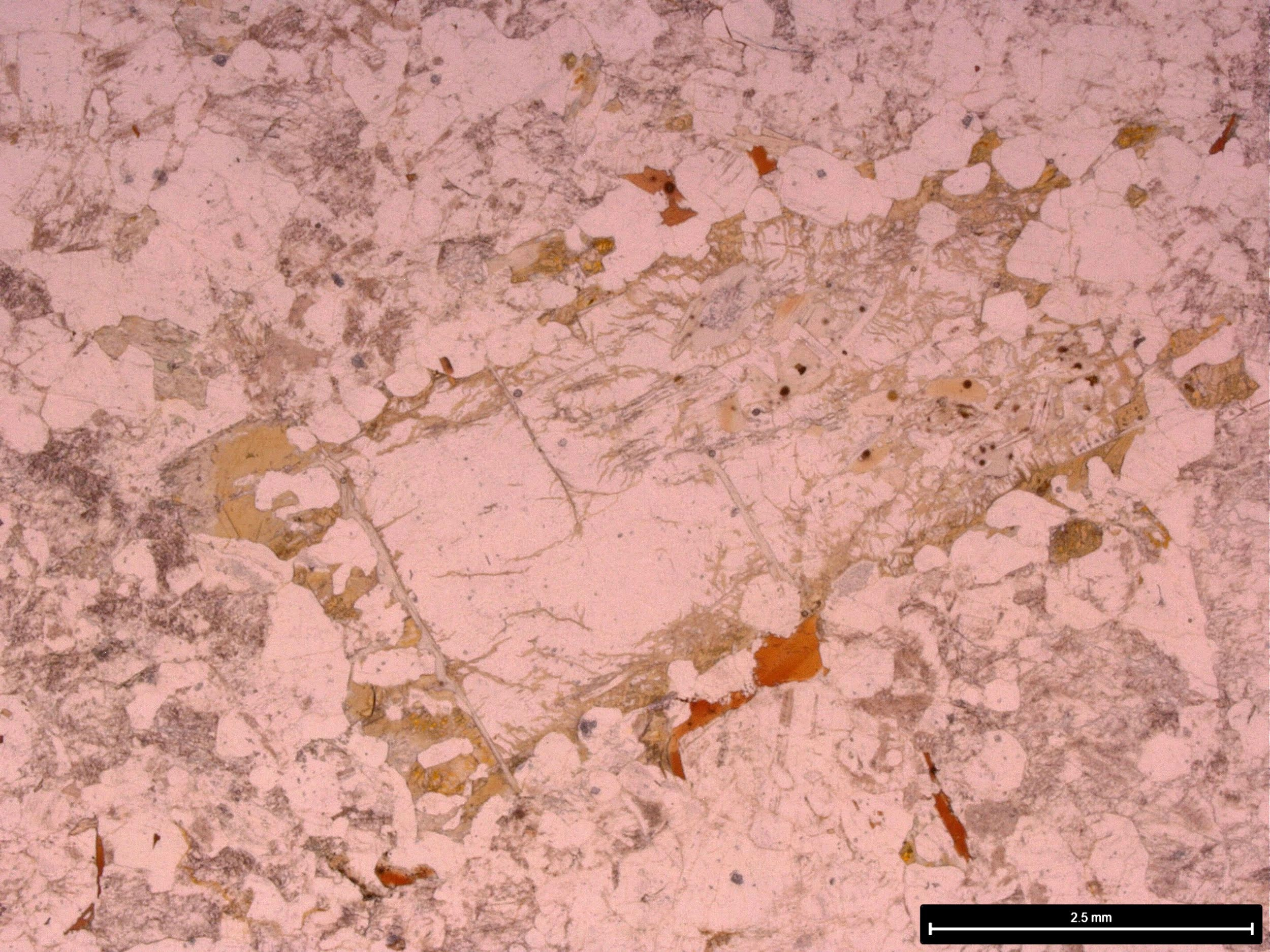
Figure 4a. Plane polarized light photomicrograph of cordierite in sample CV-142 from the Strathbogie S-type Granite.

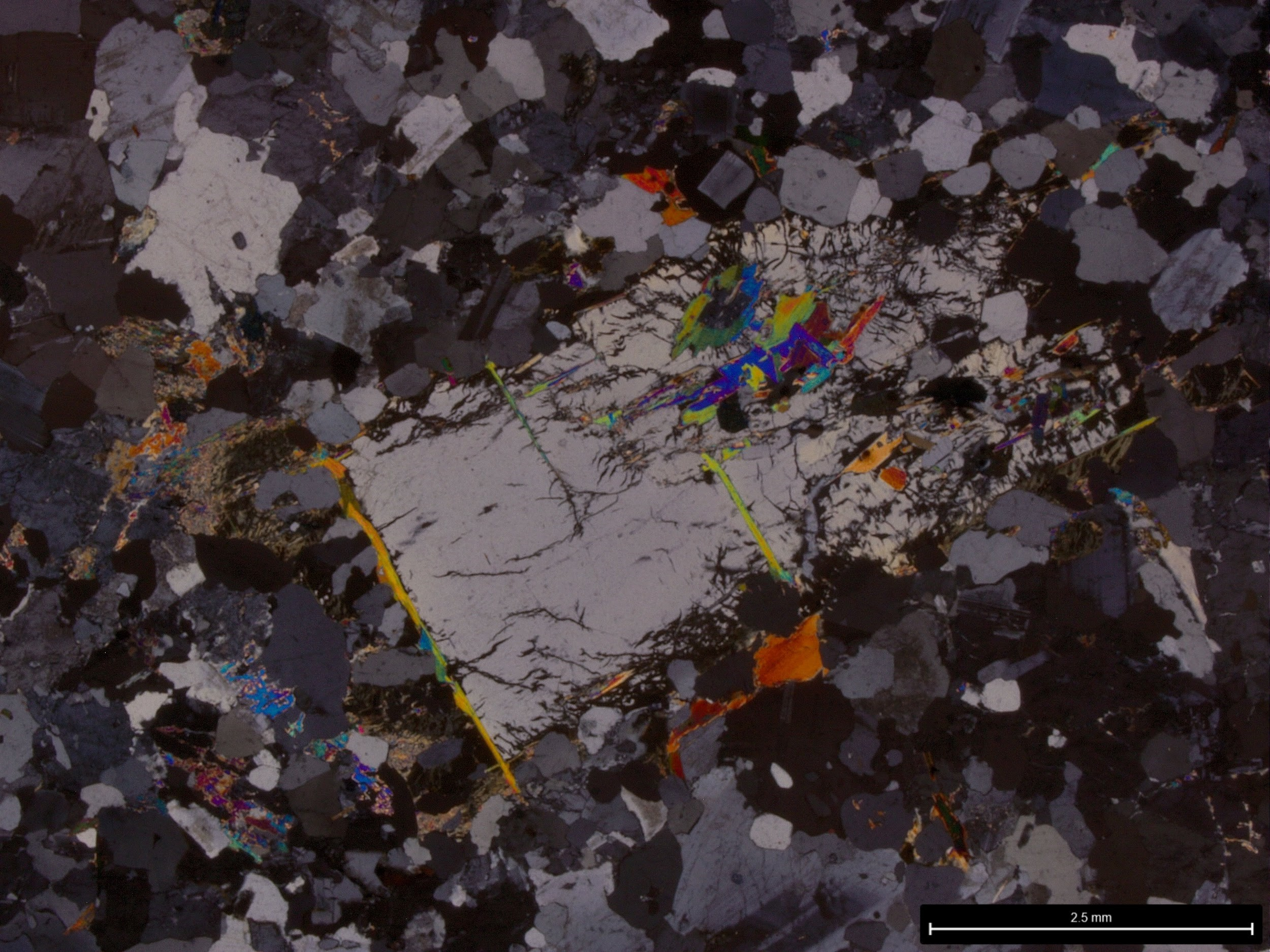
Figure 4b. Cross-polarized light photomicrograph showing cordierite from sample CV-142 of the S-type Strathbogie Granite.

=== Accessory minerals (present in amounts < 1 volume%) ===
Accessory minerals commonly observed in S-type granites include zircon, apatite, tourmaline, monazite and xenotime. Monazite is considered a diagnostic accessory mineral of S-type granites, whereas allanite is diagnostic of I-type granites. Oxide minerals in S-type granites will more commonly be ilmenite rather than magnetite.

Accessory minerals in S-type granites commonly are associated with, or occur as inclusions, in biotite. For example, apatite occurs in S-type granites in greater modal abundance and as larger, discrete crystals than in the I-type granites.

Figure 5a, 5b, and 5c show the mineral tourmaline associated with quartz in sample CV-114 from the Strathbogie Granite, Australia. Figures 5a and 5b are both in plane polarized light with the orientation of tourmaline rotated to show its characteristic change in color known as pleochroism.

The calcium phosphate mineral apatite is a common accessory minerals of S-type granites. It is typically spatially associated with the mineral biotite. Figure 6 is a plane polarized light photomicrograph showing apatite crystals (clear) included in a brown biotite grain from sample CV-126 of the Strathbogie Granite. The dark circles with a clear center are pleochroic halos which form as the result of radiation damage to the biotite from mineral inclusions that contain high concentrations of uranium and/or thorium.

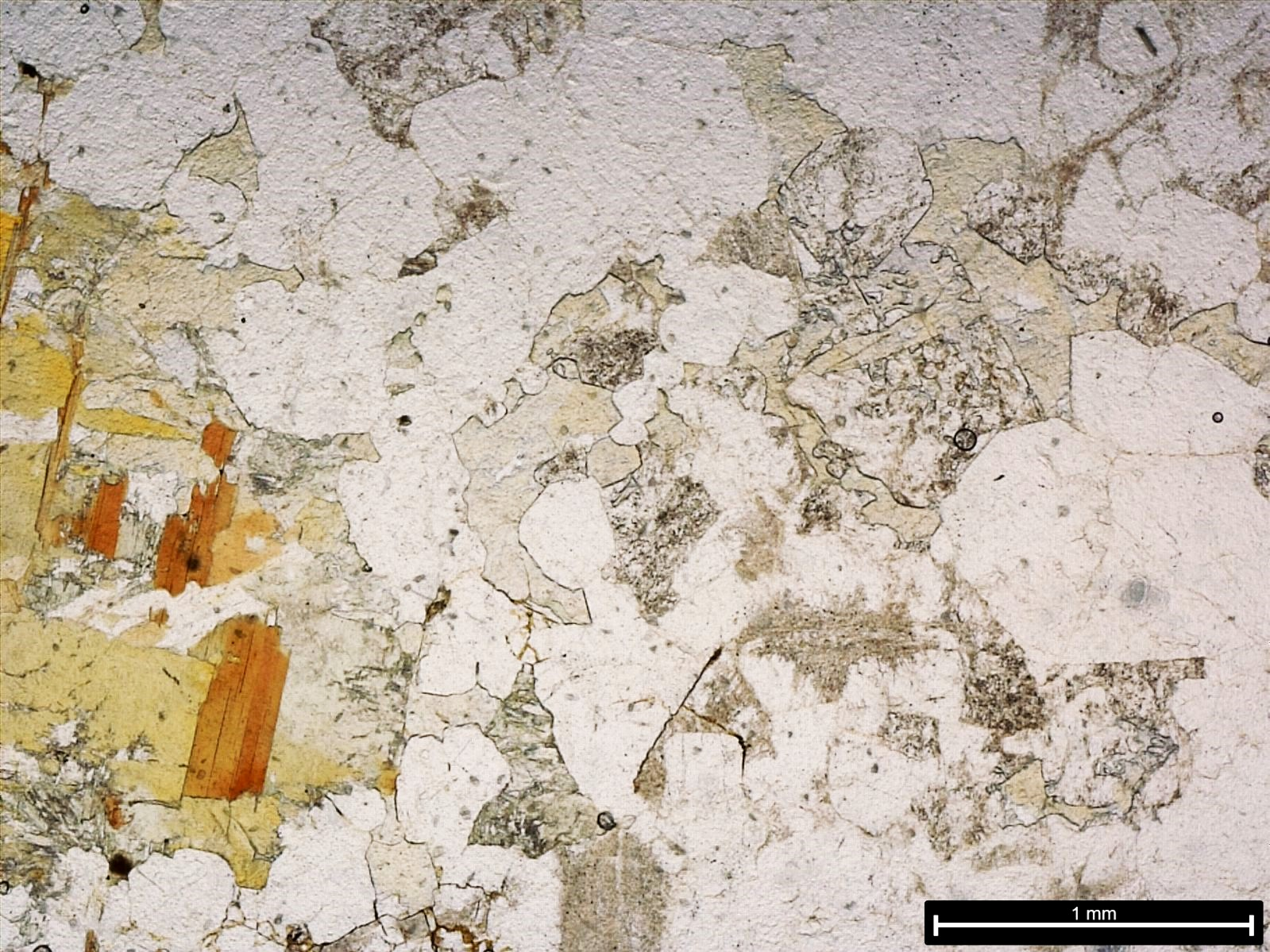
Figure 5a. Plane polarized light photomicrograph of tourmaline in sample CV-114 from the Strathbogie Granite

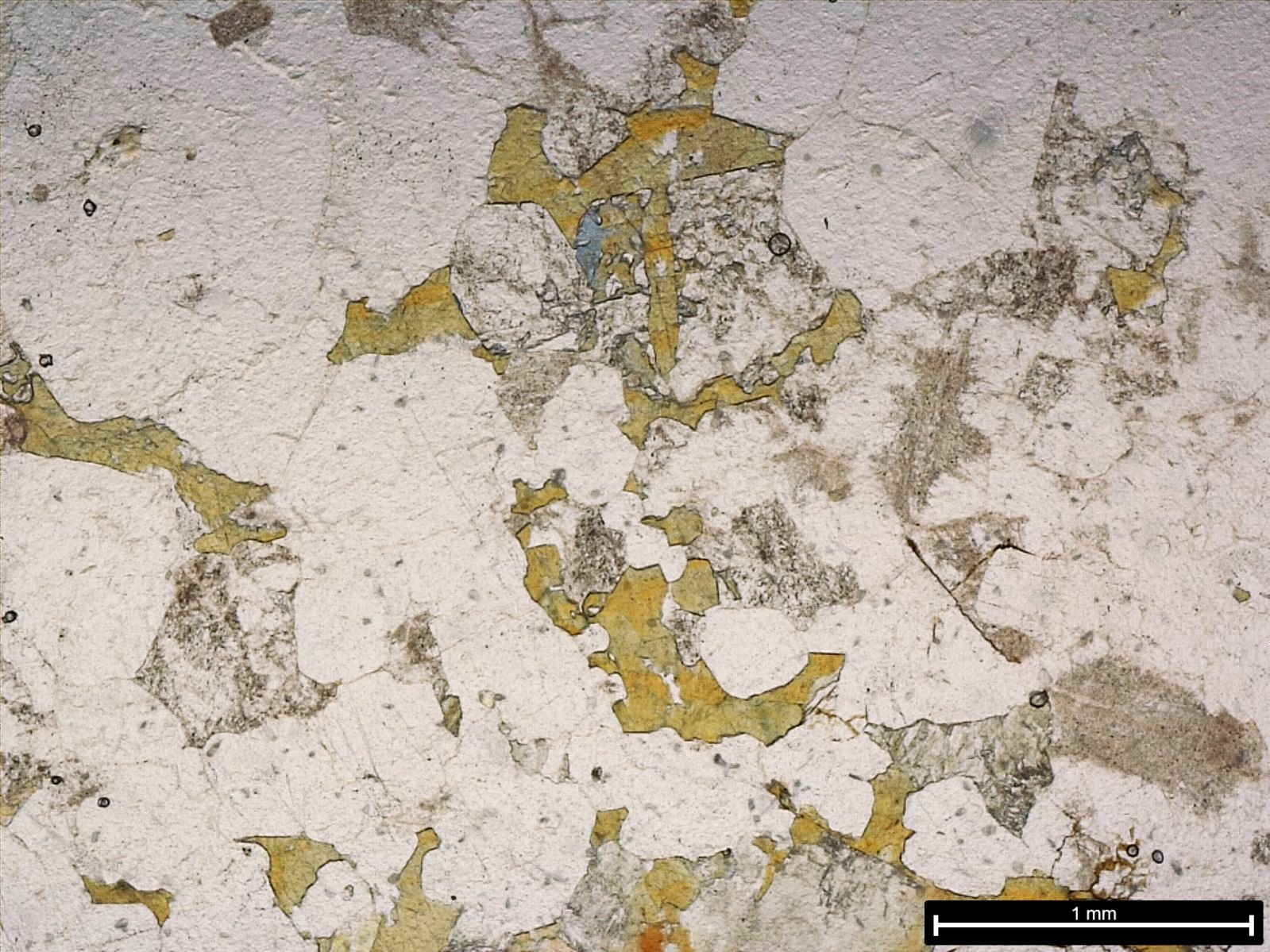
Figure 5b. Plane polarized light photomicrograph of tourmaline in sample CV-114 from the Strathbogie Granite. The thin section has been slightly rotated to show the characteristic change in color of the tourmaline known as pleochroism.

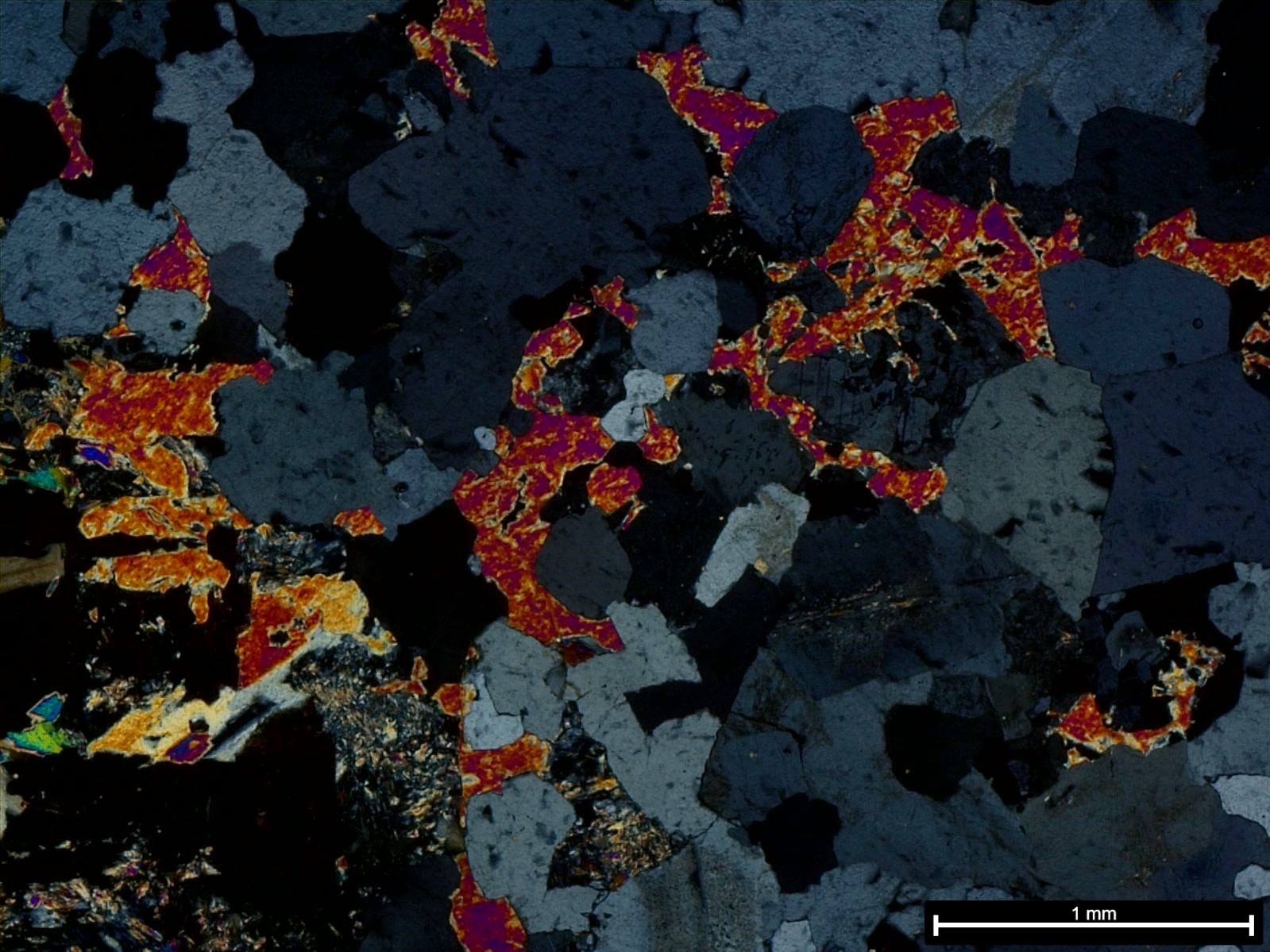
Figure 5c. Cross-polarized light photomicrograph of tourmaline in sample CV-114 from the Strathbogie Granite

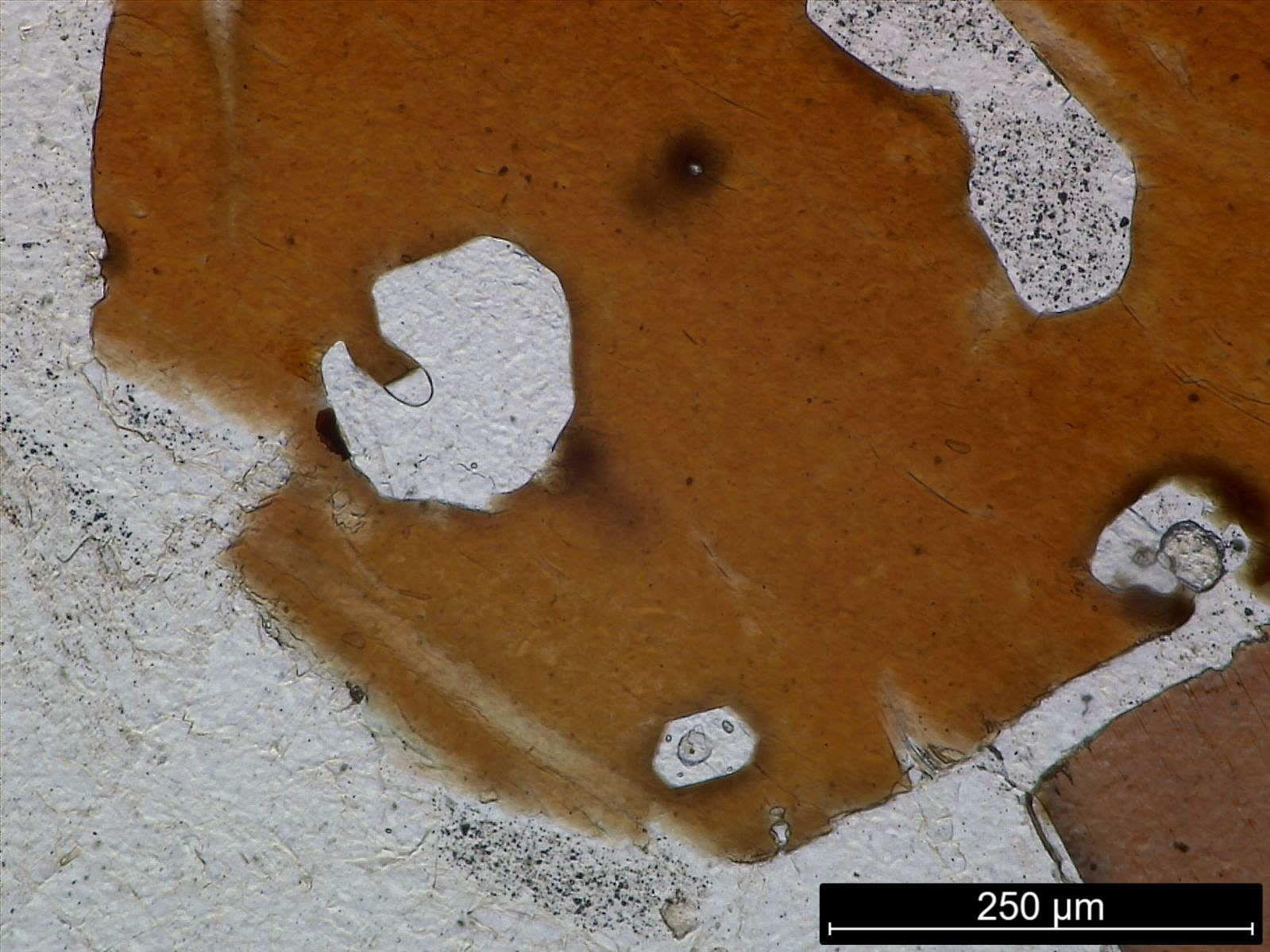
Figure 6. Plane polarized photomicrograph of apatite inclusions in a biotite from sample CV-126 of the Strathbogie Granite.

=== Alteration and subsolidus (post crystallization) minerals ===
Alteration in S-type granites can produce, in order of abundance, chlorite, white mica, clay minerals, epidote, and sericite. Cordierite and sillimanite are rarely seen without alteration halos of white mica, chlorite, muscovite, and clay minerals, and can be identified easily by the presence of these halos.

== Petrologic characteristics ==
=== Color indices ===
The color index of S-type granites can vary from melanocratic to leucocratic. Higher color indices correlate with higher plagioclase to alkali feldspar ratios. The most common high color index mineral in an S-type granite is biotite.

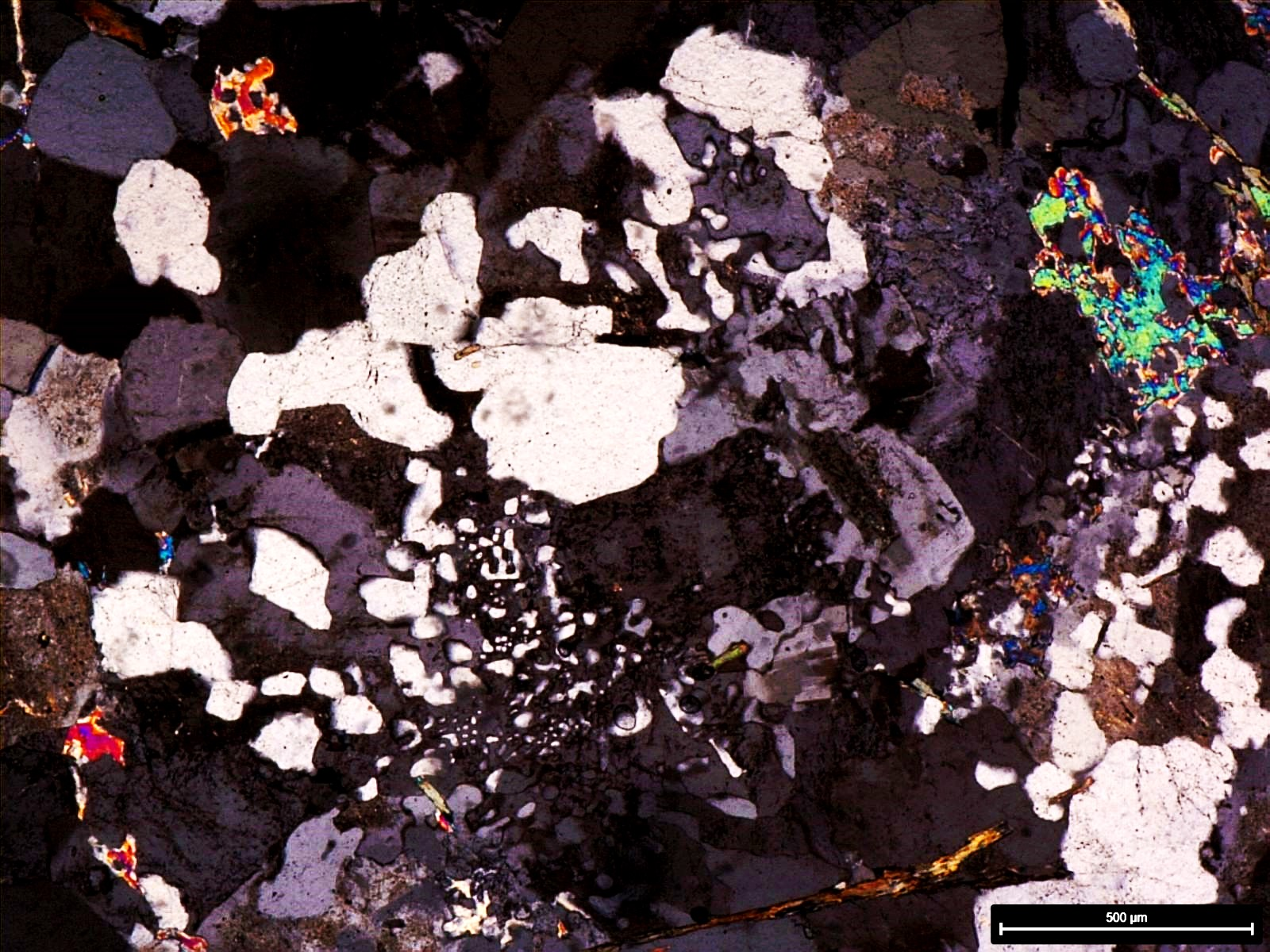
Figure 7. Cross-polarized light photomicrograph of sample CV-114 from the S-type Strathbogie Granite with quartz and feldspar displaying a granophyric texture.

=== Textures ===
S-type granites, like other granite types, can vary in crystal size from aphanitic to phaneritic; crystal size distributions include porphyritic, seriate, and rarely equigranular textures. Mafic xenoliths/enclaves can be found in S-type granites. Granophyric textures can be found in S-type granites, particularly leucocratic ones. In porphyritic S-type granites, phenocrysts are commonly feldspars, but can also be quartz, and in rare cases, such as the Strathbogie Granite, cordierite. Figure 7 shows an example of granophyric texture in the Strathbogie Granite. The mineral quartz (light grey to off white) forms irregular to angular crystals of varying size that are intimately intergrown with the mineral feldspar (dark grey) indicating rapid crystallization.

=== Pressure quenching ===
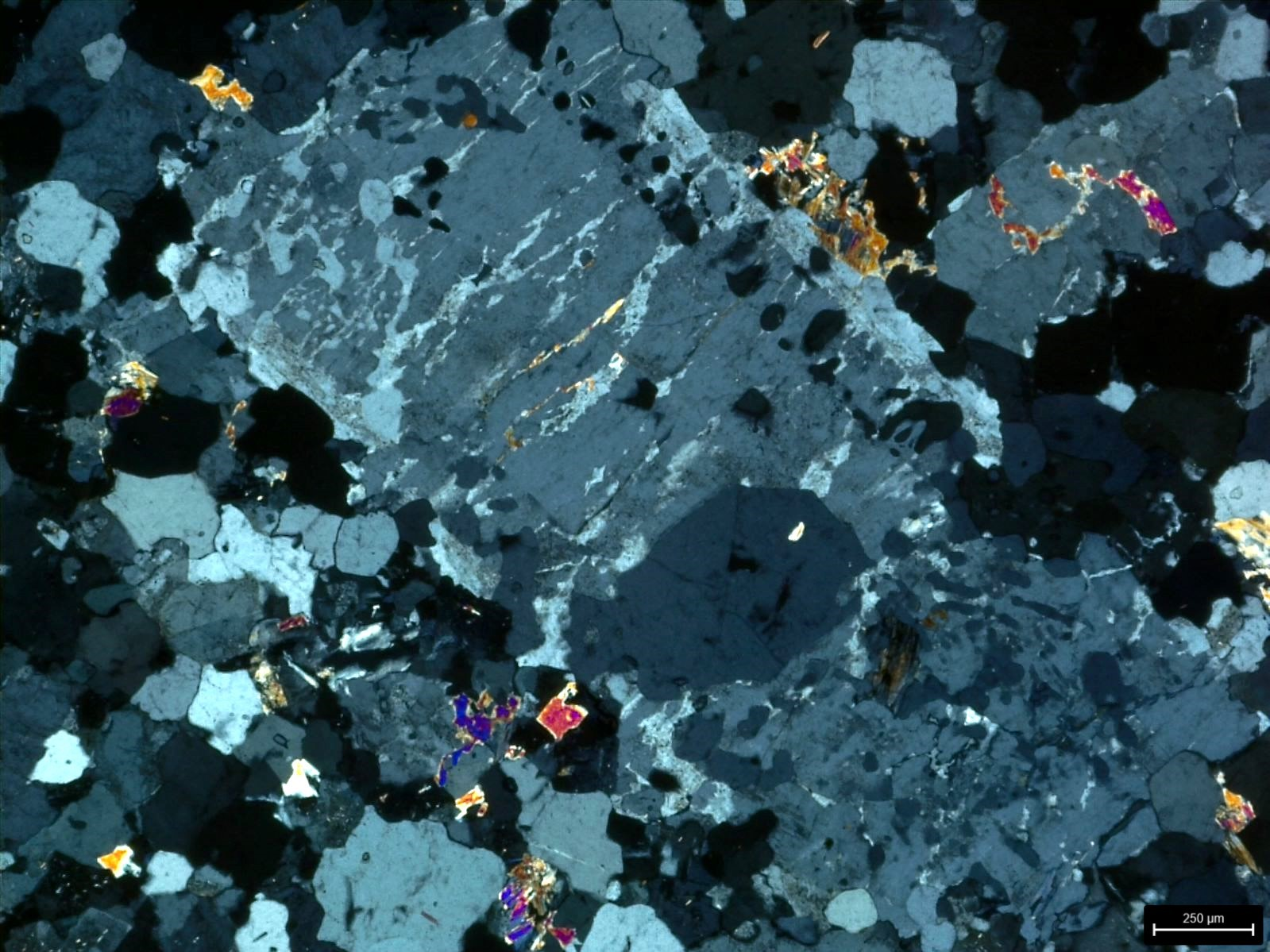
Figure 8. Cross-polarized light photomicrograph of a "pressure-quench" texture in sample Cv-114 from the S-type Strathbogie Granite.

A rapid change in pressure, from loss of volatile components (e.g., dissolved water in the melt) during crystallization can lead to a period of rapid crystallization. Change in crystal growth forms that are interpreted to occur as a result of this loss in pressure are known as "pressure-quenching" textures. Figure 8 is a photomicrograph in cross-polarized light showing alkali-feldspar (perthite core)-quartz (in extinction near the feldspar crystal rim) intergrowth, overgrown by a partial rim of plagioclase texture in Sample CV-114 from the Strathbogie Granite (cross polarized light). This texture is interpreted to represent partial quenching possibly due to a loss of pressure.

== Geochemistry ==
=== Major elements ===
Major element characteristics of S-type granites include lower levels of sodium and calcium, and elevated levels of silica and aluminium. Iron and magnesium content correlate with color index in S-type granites. In addition, S-type granites contain more magnesium than iron. With respect to aluminium, S-type granites are always peraluminous, or have a total alkali (+calcium) to aluminium ratio of greater than one.

=== Trace elements ===
S-type granites contain elevated levels of potassium, rubidium and lead, and are depleted in strontium. With respect to rare earth elements, S-type granites are light rare earth element depleted compared to other granite types.

=== Isotopic characteristics ===
Strontium isotope characteristics in S-type granites are more variable and radiogenic than for I-type plutons. With respect to oxygen isotopes, S-type granites are enriched in heavy oxygen. Zircons within S-type granites can be inherited and can predate the emplacement of the granite.

== Interpretation ==
=== Source characteristics ===
S-type granites are so named as a shorthand for “Supracrustal” type. The interpretation of S-type granites are that they are sourced from the partial melting of sedimentary rocks (supracrustal) that have been through one or more cycles of weathering. Evidence for this include aluminium and silica enrichment, caused by the weathering process of the source rock. Weathering causes alkalis, such as sodium, to leave the rock and therefore enrich the rock in non-soluble components.

=== The I-S Line ===
The I-S line is an observed contact between I- and S-type granites in an igneous terrane. This contact is usually clearly defined; one example of this occurring is within the Lachlan Fold Belt of Australia. The I-S line is interpreted to be the location of a paleo-structure in the subsurface that separated the generation zones of the two different melts.

=== Suites and Supersuites ===
Granite plutons can be grouped into suites and super suites by their source regions, which in turn are interpreted by comparing their compositions. This interpretation comes from the plotting of different element concentrations against the level of evolution of the granite, usually as percent silica or its magnesium to iron ratio. Igneous rocks with the same source region will plot along a line in silica to element space.

=== Restite unmixing ===
Granites traced to the same source region can often have very variable mineralogy; color index for example can vary greatly within the same batholith. In addition, many minerals resist melting and would not melt at the temperatures known to create the magmas that form S-type granites. One theory that explains this mineralogic anomaly is restite unmixing. In this theory, minerals that are resistant to melting, such as the mafic silicate minerals (e.g., the color index minerals), do not melt but are rather brought up by the melt in solid state. Melts that are farther from their source regions would therefore contain lower modal abundance of the color index minerals, while those closer to their source regions would have a higher color index. This theory supplements the theories of partial melting and fractional crystallization.

=== Other models ===
Other models include: magma mixing, crustal assimilation and source region mixing. More recent studies have shown that the source regions of I-type and S-type magmas cannot be homogeneously igneous or sedimentary, respectively. Instead, many magmas show signs of being sourced from a combination of source materials. These magmas can be characterized by having a series of neodymium and hafnium isotope characteristics that can be thought of as a combination of both I- and S-type isotopic characteristics. Magma mixing is another aspect of granite formation that must be taken into account when observing granites. Magma mixing occurs when magmas of a different composition intrude a larger magma body. In some cases, the melts are immiscible and stay separated to form pillow like collections of denser mafic magmas on the bottom of less dense felsic magma chambers. The mafic pillow basalts will demonstrate a felsic matrix, suggesting magma mingling. Alternatively, the melts mix together and form a magma of a composition intermediate to the intrusive and intruded melt.

== Localities of occurrence ==
Well known examples of S-type granites occur in:

=== Asia ===
- Malay Peninsula

=== Australia ===
- Lachlan Fold Belt
  - Cootralantra Granodiorite
  - Cooma Granodiorite
  - Bulla Granitoid
  - Strathbogie Granite
  - Granya Granite

=== Europe ===
- West Carpathian Mountains
- Naxos, Greece
- West European Variscan Belt

=== North America ===
- Sierra Nevada

=== South America ===
- Cordillera Real in Ecuador
