= Geology of Norway =

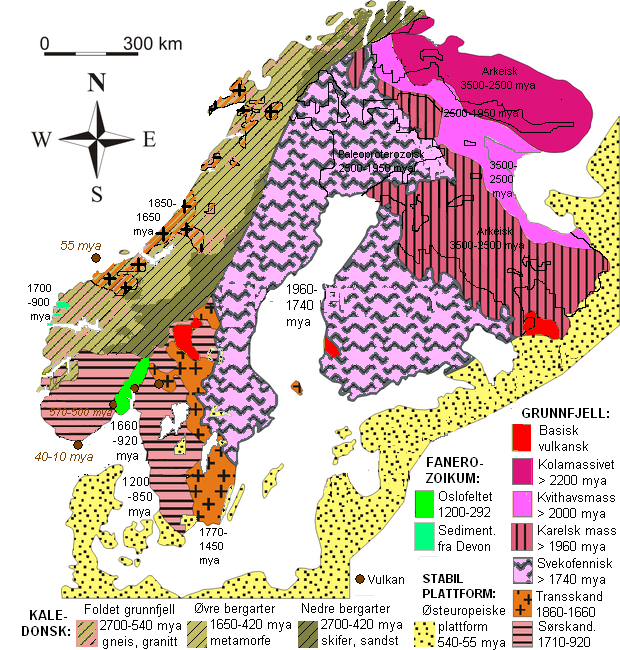
Geological map of Fennoscandia

The geology of Norway encompasses the history of Earth that can be interpreted by rock types found in Norway, and the associated sedimentological history of soils and rock types.

The Norwegian mountains were formed around 400 million years ago (Ma) during the Caledonian orogeny.

== Precambrian ==
Rocks of Archean age in Norway are confined to a few 10 km-scale areas within younger metamorphic belts exposed on islands off the west coast of northern Norway and as smaller fragments locally in the Western Gneiss region in south-central Norway.

Despite intense reworking during the Caledonian orogeny in some areas, three major belts can be recognised in the Proterozoic rocks of Norway, the Neoproterozoic and Mesoproterozoic Gothian and Sveconorwegian, the Palaeoproterozoic Svecokarelian and the intervening Transscandinavian Igneous Belt of late Palaeoproterozoic age. About 1400 million years ago in the Mesoproterozoic tectonic extension and continental magmatism led to the formation of Kattsund-Koster dyke swarm in southeastern Norway.

=== Neoproterozoic ===
The later part of the Neoproterozoic records the break-up of the Rodinia supercontinent and the formation of the Iapetus Ocean. Passive margin sequences are preserved within the lowermost allochthon and parautochthon of the Caledonian thrust sheets. In southern Norway the sequence is known as Sparagmite. The depositional environment changes from fluvial in the parautochthon to deepwater marine in the lowermost allochthon consistent with a paleogeography of an originally westward deepening basin.

The uppermost part of the Neoproterozoic sequence throughout Norway includes a tillite, a record of the Varanger ice age which occurred between roughly 630–590 Ma, the final part of the Cryogenian Period. This was followed by fluvial and shallow water marine deposits of the Ediacaran before a major marine transgression at the start of the Cambrian.

== Early Palaeozoic ==
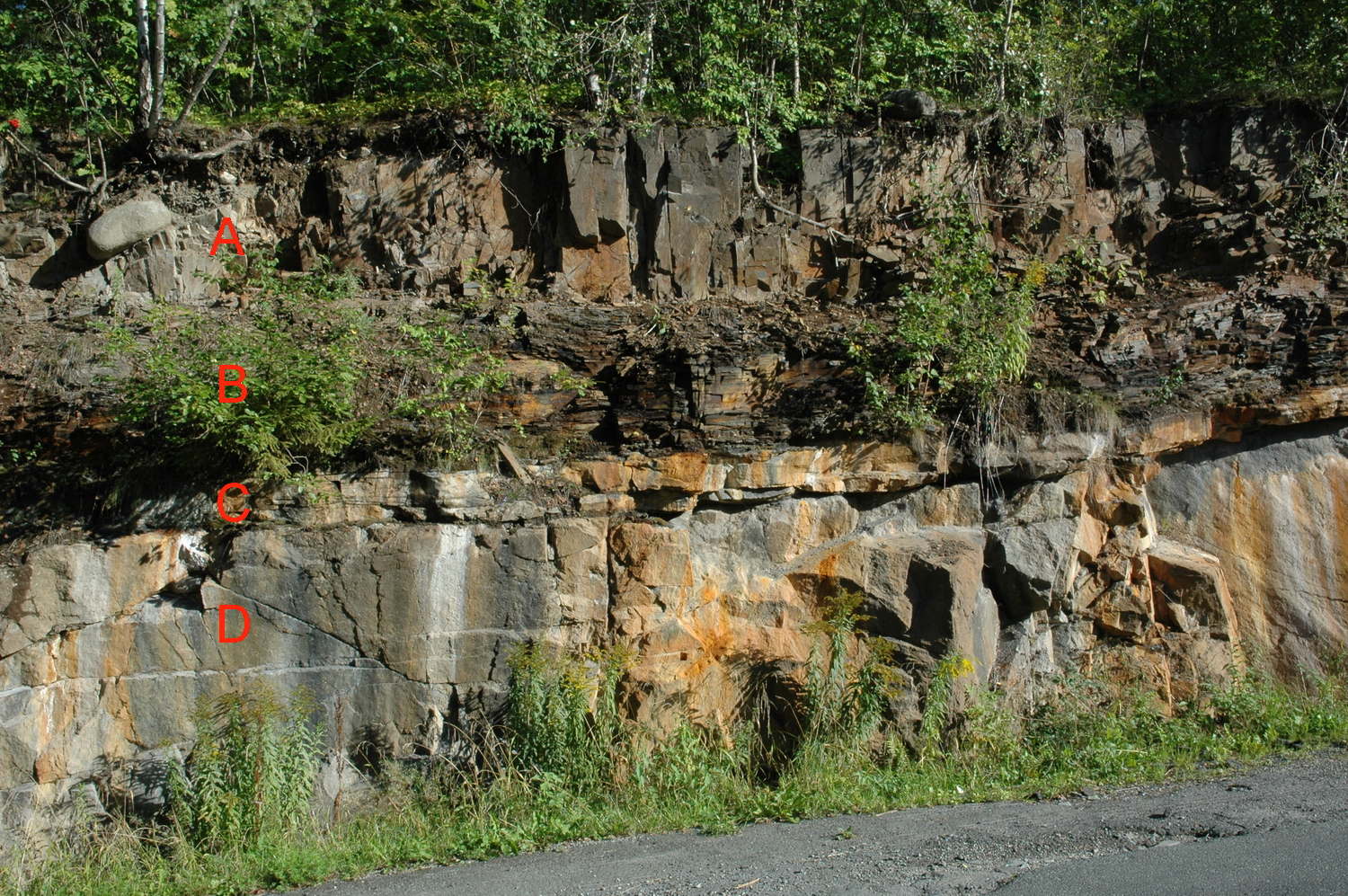
Cambrian conglomerate, limestone and Alum shale B, lying unconformably above Precambrian gneiss D, intruded by a Permian lamprophyre sill A, Slemmestad, western Oslofjord

The early Palaeozoic history of Norway is recorded in sequences preserved either as autochthon or at various levels within the allochthon. They relate to the further widening of Iapetus during the Cambrian, the start of closure during the Early Ordovician with the accretion of terranes and ophiolite obduction during the Late Ordovician and continent-continent collision at the end of the Silurian.

== Caledonian orogeny ==
Within the entire exposed 1800 kilometre length of this orogenic belt the following sequence is recognised from the base upwards:

- Autochthon

undisturbed foreland of the Baltic plate

- Parautochthon

thrust sheets that have moved only a short distance (up to tens of km) from their original position

- Lower allochthon

far travelled thrust sheets derived from the Baltic plate passive margin, mainly sediments associated with the break-up of Rodinia

- Middle allochthon

also derived from the margin of the Baltic plate, Proterozoic basement and its psammitic cover

- Upper allochthon

thrust sheets including island arc and ophiolitic sequences

- Uppermost allochthon

thrust sheets containing sediments with fossil assemblages indicating an origin on the margin of the Laurentian plate

This vertically stacked sequence thus represents the passive margins of Baltica and Laurentia and intervening island arcs and back-arc basins telescoped together and emplaced on top of the Baltic Shield, involving hundreds of kilometres of shortening.

== Devonian ==
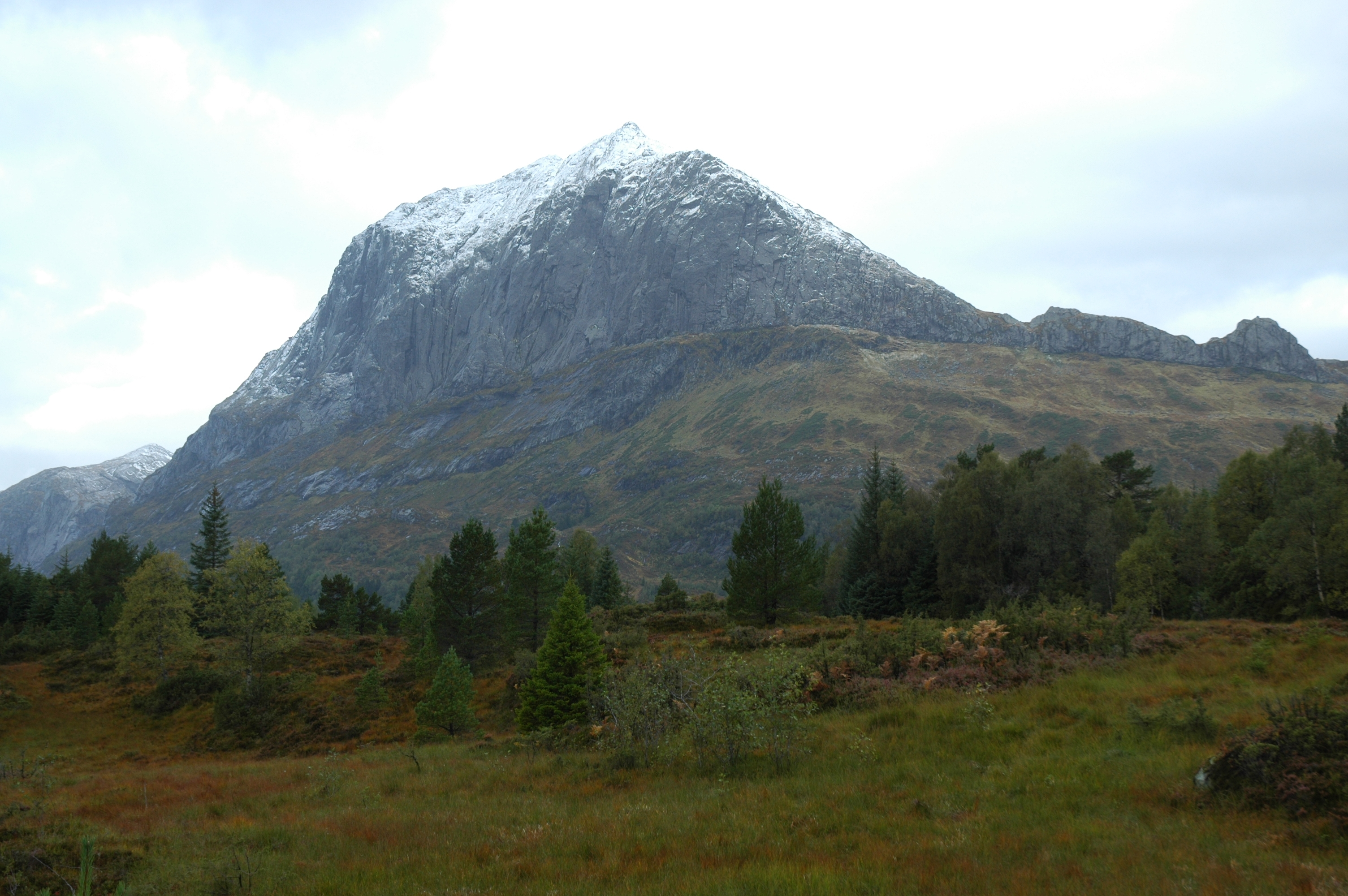
View of Storehesten in Sunnfjord Municipality, part of the Kvamshesten Basin, formed of Devonian conglomerates and sandstones in tectonic contact with thick mylonites of the Nordfjord-Sogn Detachment

Devonian age continental sediments are exposed in three main areas in and around mainland Norway; the Solund, Kvamshesten, Håsteinen and Hornelen basins along the west coast between Sognefjord and Nordfjord, on the islands of Smøla, Hitra and the western end of the Fosen Peninsula in Trøndelag and at Røragen near Røros close to the Swedish border. Further Devonian deposits are found on Svalbard.

During the Devonian Period the thickened welt of crust formed by the Caledonian orogeny began to collapse. Some thrust surfaces show evidence of reactivation as low-angle extensional faults, but the main structures formed at this time were large-scale extensional detachments. Movement on these detachments led to deposition of thick sequences of continental clastic sediments in their hanging walls and was in part responsible for the exhumation of late Caledonian ultra high-pressure metamorphic rocks, including eclogites, in their footwalls. The displacements on these structures range from nearly orthogonal to the Caledonian chain in the south to being strongly oblique in mid-Norway.

== Carboniferous ==
The only Carboniferous age strata preserved onshore are found on Svalbard. Rocks of this age have also been proved by drilling beneath the Barents Sea, but nowhere else on the Norwegian continental shelf.

== Permian ==
In southern Norway the Permian was a period of W-E directed rifting with associated igneous activity, during which the Oslo graben formed.

== Triassic ==
The only Triassic rocks preserved onshore are found on Svalbard but strata of this age are also widely known from the results of exploration drilling along the entire continental shelf.

== Jurassic ==
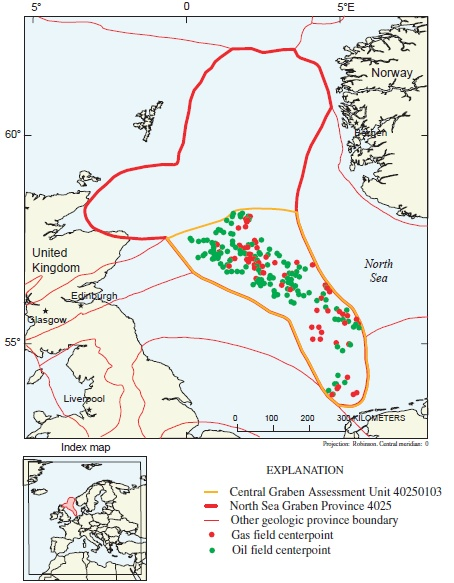
North Sea Central Graben

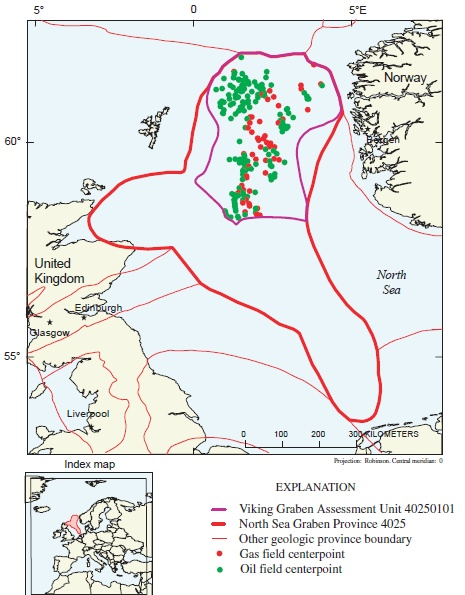
North Sea Viking Graben

Rocks of Jurassic age are exposed onshore at one locality on Andøya and have been discovered nearshore and beneath the Beitstadfjorden, northeast of Trondheim. As with the Triassic, Jurassic strata have a wide distribution along the whole continental shelf. They were dominantly deposited in a deltaic to shallow marine environment.

The Late Jurassic was the main rifting phase in the Central Graben, Viking Graben, More Basin, Vøring Basin and on the Barents shelf. This was also the period of deposition of the main source rock that has generated most of the petroleum discovered in the offshore areas.

== Cretaceous ==
The Late Jurassic basins offshore were infilled and onlapped by the Cretaceous post-rift sequence. These are dominated by mudstones although the Upper Cretaceous sequence from the Viking Graben and south is dominated by chalk.

In the outer parts of the Vøring margin rifting restarted in the late Cretaceous, continuing through to the early Palaeocene. This event is interpreted to be a precursor to the break-up of the North Atlantic. Little is known of the then elevation of what would be the area of current day Norway.

== See also ==
- Scandinavian Mountains
- Geological Survey of Norway
