= Solund Basin =

Sedimentary basin in Norway

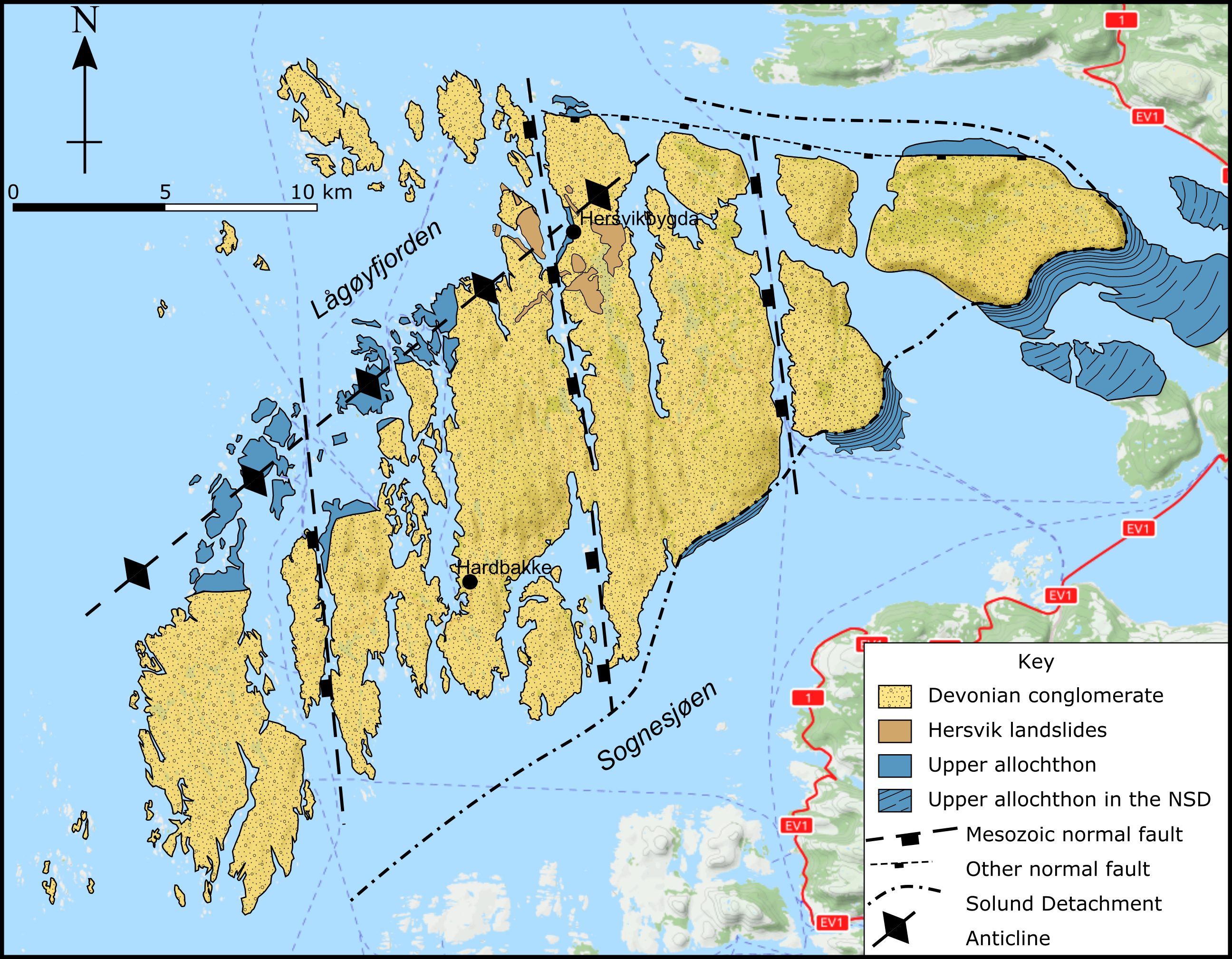
- Geological map of the Solund Basin (NSD=Nordfjord-Sogn Detachment)
- Coordinates: 61.14°N 4.88°E
- Etymology: Solund Municipality
- Region: Vestland
- Country: Norway

Characteristics
- On/Offshore: Onshore
- Area: 800 km^{2} (310 sq mi)

Geology
- Age: Devonian
- Faults: Solund Detachment

The Solund Basin is a sedimentary basin containing at least 6 kilometres (3.7 mi) of mainly coarse conglomerates of Devonian age. It is the southernmost of a group of basins of similar age found along the southwest coast of Norway between Sognefjord and Nordfjord, developed in the hanging-wall of the Nordfjord-Sogn Detachment. It was formed as a result of extensional tectonics during the post-orogenic collapse of crust thickened during the Caledonian orogeny, towards the end of the Silurian period. It is named for Solund Municipality in Vestland county, Norway.

== Tectonic setting ==
During the later part of the Silurian period, the western margin of the Baltic Plate was affected by the main collisional event of the Caledonian orogeny, known as the Scandian phase. This led to large-scale thrusting and the development of a mountain belt similar in scale to the Himalayas. Soon after the collision finished during the Early Devonian, the thickened crust began to extend. Initially the extension took place by reactivation of Caledonian thrust faults, known as Mode 1 extension. The uplift and exhumation led to a reduction of dip in these reactivated thrusts, making them progressively less mechanically viable. At this point Mode II extension took over, with development of large extensional shear zones that cross-cut the Caledonian thrust pile, such as the Nordfjord-Sogn Detachment.

== Extent ==
The preserved part of the Solund Basin covers about 800 square kilometres (310 sq mi), including most of the islands of Ytre Sula, Steinsundøyna, Sula, Losna, many other smaller islands and the mainland peninsula on which the mountain of Lihesten lies in Hyllestad Municipality.

== Basin fill ==
The dominant lithology is conglomerate, with some breccia and subordinate amounts of sandstone, organised into somewhat irregular cycles of coarsening up and then fining on a scale of tens of metres up to more than 100 m. The conglomerate is typically very coarse, consisting of cobble to boulder sized clasts. A strong depositional fabric is present with clast long axes showing a marked preferred orientation of northwest–southeast, often with well-developed imbrication.

=== Hersvik landslides ===
In the area around Hersvikbygda, towards the north of the island of Sula, a series of large exotic lenticular bodies are found within the conglomerates towards the base of the sequence. They consist of a wide range of lithologies, including mafic and felsic volcanics, granite, diorite, gabbro and metasediments. When they were first described in 1926, they were interpreted as small thrust sheets involving the emplacement of slices of the underlying upper allochthon rocks beneath the basal unconformity into the conglomerate sequence. Later investigations failed to find any evidence for tectonic contacts at the base of the lenses and one large body of monomict brecciated gabbro was interpreted as a debris flow. At the base of one of the lenses a body of rhyolite was interpreted as a contemporaneous Devonian lava flow, the only example of volcanism of that age described from Norway. A reappraisal of these deposits, including dating the rhyolite body as Silurian, has interpreted all of these bodies as landslides, probably derived from rocks of the Solund-Stavfjord Ophiolite Complex on the basin margin to the north.

Similar landslide deposits have also been recognised from the southeastern boundary of the basin near Kråkevåg, at the highest preserved stratigraphic level, demonstrating that such landslides were active throughout the deposition of the preserved part of the basin.

== Structure ==
In the southeastern part of the basin, the conglomerate sequence dips 20–25° to the southeast. The main fold structure is the Lågøyfjorden anticline which runs southwest–northeast. To the northwest of the fold hinge the dip is towards the north or northwest. The southeastern margin of the basin is formed by the low-angle Solund Fault or Solund Detachment, part of the Nordfjord-Sogn Detachment. Close to this margin small down-to-the-northwest listric normal faults are developed within the conglomerates, which merge with the detachment itself. At the fault contact, the lowermost metre of the conglomerates is strongly sheared, with a foliation parallel to the fault and the clasts become elongated in a direction parallel to the lineation in the underlying mylonite. The conglomerate is also noticeably deformed with well-developed cleavage in zone about 2.5 km wide parallel to the Solund Fault. The conglomerates show evidence of very low-grade metamorphism with recognition of an assemblage of authigenic minerals that indicate temperatures in the range 230–330°C, consistent with maximum burial of up to 13 km. The mylonites immediately beneath the Solund Fault appear to be a highly deformed version of the mafic rocks of the upper allochthon. These mylonites contain a suite of minor structures that show slightly oblique top-down-to-the-northwest movement.

The basin is cut by a prominent series of nearly north–south trending faults that are interpreted to be of latest Paleozoic to Mesozoic age, associated with west–east extension in the North Sea rift that began during the Permo-Triassic.

== See also ==
- Hornelen Basin
- Kvamshesten Basin
