= Hornelen Basin =

Sedimentary basin in Vestland, Norway

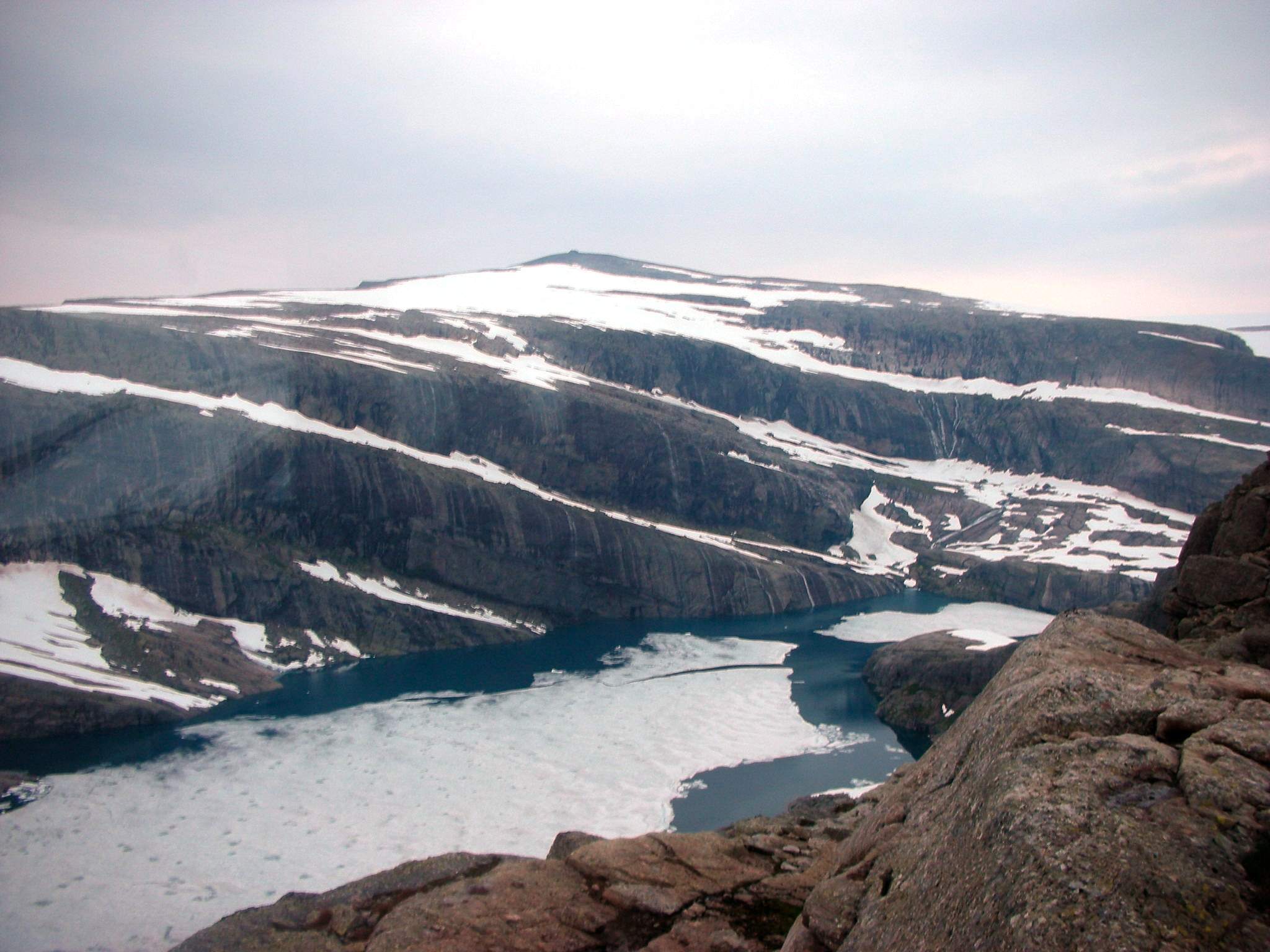
- Five of the ca. 100 m thick cycles of axial sandstone on Blånibba, the highest point in the Hornelen Basin

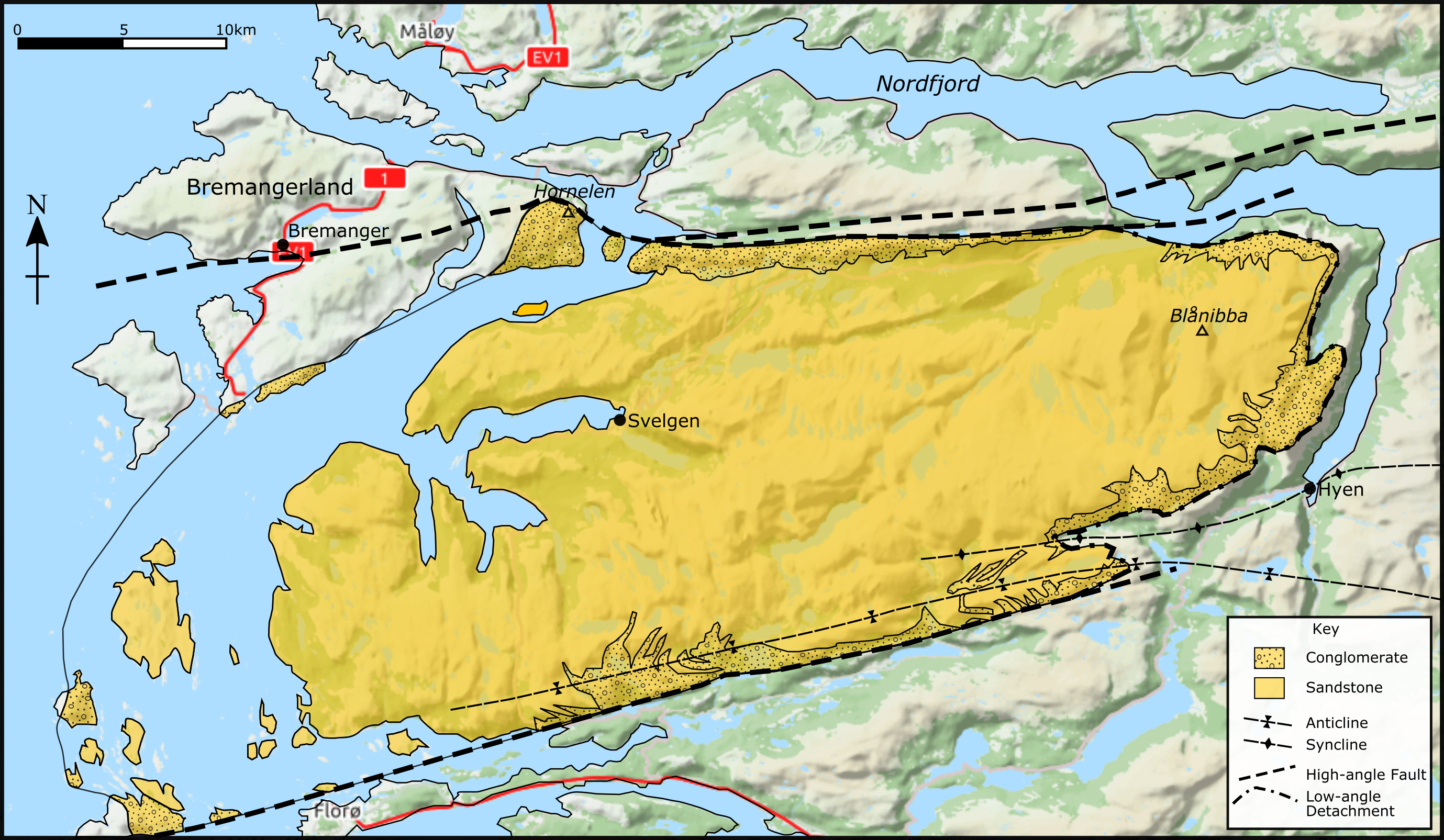
- Geological map of the Hornelen Basin
- Coordinates: 61.75°N 5.45°E
- Etymology: Hornelen
- Region: Vestland
- Country: Norway

Characteristics
- On/Offshore: Onshore
- Area: 1,100 km^{2} (420 sq mi)

Geology
- Basin type: Extensional
- Age: Devonian
- Faults: Nordfjord-Sogn Detachment

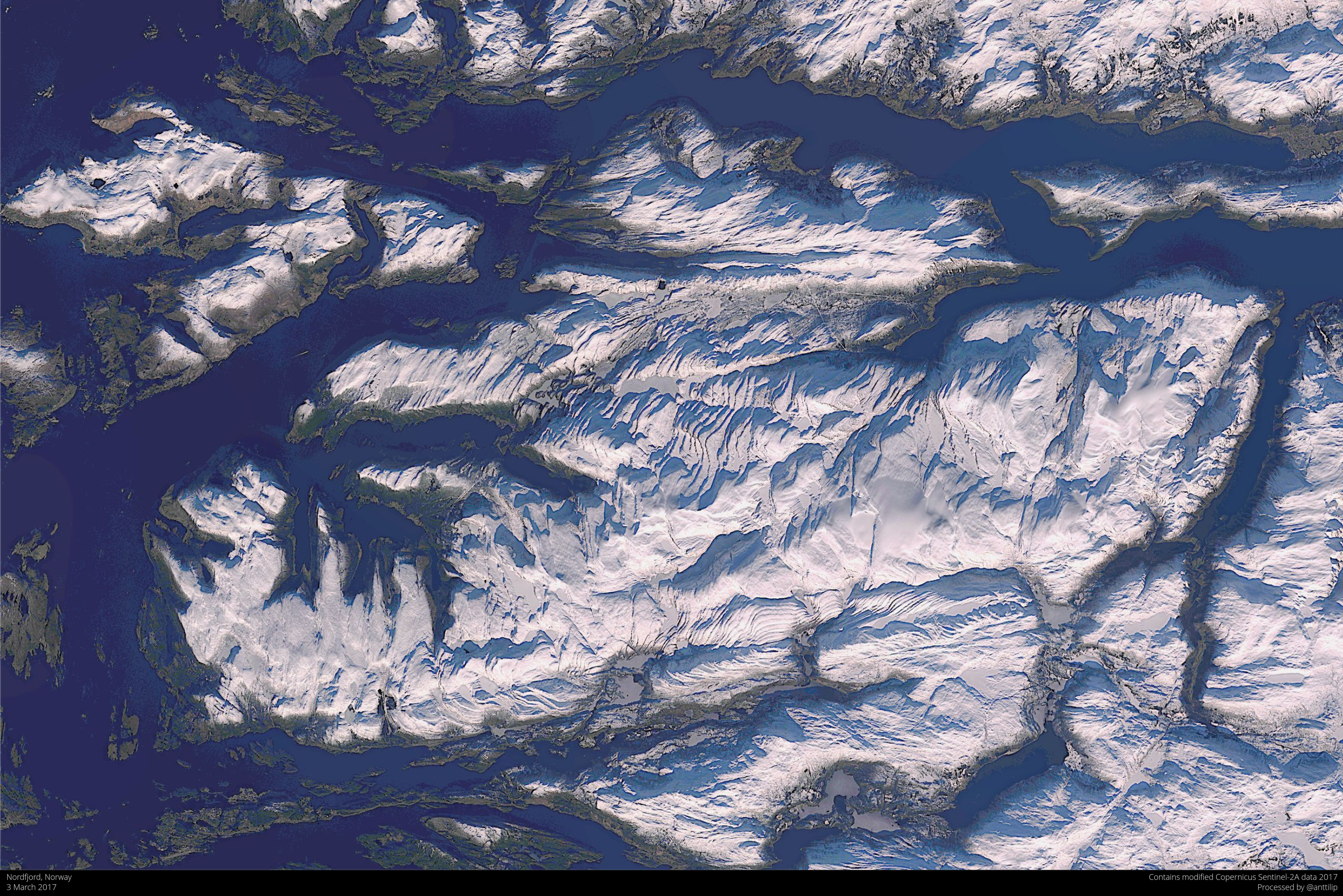
Satellite image of the Hornelen Basin, showing variation in the strike of bedding and the Grøndalen syncline at the southern margin

The Hornelen Basin is a sedimentary basin in Vestland, Norway, containing an estimated 25 km stratigraphic thickness of coarse clastic sedimentary rocks of Devonian age. It forms part of a group of basins of similar age along the west coast of Norway between Sognefjord and Nordfjord, related to movement on the Nordfjord-Sogn Detachment. It formed as a result of extensional tectonics as part of the post-orogenic collapse of crust that was thickened during the Caledonian Orogeny towards the end of the Silurian period. It is named for the mountain Hornelen on the northern margin of the basin.

== Tectonic setting ==
During the later part of the Silurian period, the western margin of the Baltic Plate was affected by the main collisional event of the Caledonian orogeny, known as the Scandian phase. This led to large-scale thrusting and the development of a mountain belt similar in scale to the Himalayas. Soon after the collision finished during the Early Devonian, the thickened crust began to extend. Initially the extension took place by reactivation of Caledonian thrust faults, known as Mode 1 extension. The uplift and exhumation led to a reduction of dip in these reactivated thrusts, making them progressively less mechanically viable. At this point Mode II extension took over, with development of large extensional shear zones that cross-cut the Caledonian thrust pile, such as the Nordfjord-Sogn Detachment.

== Basin fill ==
The dominant lithology is sandstone, which is organised into a series of coarsening-upward cycles, laid down by a west-draining axial river system. At the basin margins the sandstones interfinger with conglomerates deposited by alluvial fans. The northern conglomerates were deposited by mainly debris flow fans, while those to the south are mainly streamflow in type. Near the northern margin there is a zone where siltstones and mudstones are developed, forming the finest-grained sediments in the basin. The depositional environment for these fine-grained rocks is thought to be lacustrine.

== Age ==
The sequence has been dated as Devonian, based on Middle Devonian plant fossils found in the upper part of the succession.

== Clast provenance ==
The study of clast lithology within the Hornelen sequence has been used to understand the exposed geology in the areas that provided a sediment source for the basin. The currently exposed bedrock to the north and east of the basin consist of metamorphic rocks of the Western Gneiss Region (WGR) that have been affected by ultra-high-pressure metamorphism, which are everywhere in faulted contact with the basin. No clasts have been found that have evidence of high-pressure metamorphism indicating that the WGR did not become exposed at the surface until after the highest preserved levels of the basin were deposited. The clasts do match well with the rock types observed within the Caledonian thrust sheets on which the Devonian sediments lie unconformably to the west of the basin.

== Structure ==
The Devonian sequence has an overall eastward dip of 20–25°, from the unconformable contact in the west up to the tectonic contact in the east. This is modified near the northern and southern margins. Towards the northern margin the direction of dip becomes more southeasterly. Near the southern margin the basin is folded into a west–southwest trending anticline and syncline, parallel to the faulted margin. There is little evidence of internal faulting in the basin, although fracture sets are well-developed and two stages of vein development have been observed.

The northern margin of the basin is formed by a steep south-dipping fault that is interpreted to be mainly post-Devonian brittle structure that has formed close to the original basin edge. The southern margin is formed by the steep north-dipping Haukå Fault, which is interpreted to increase in displacement westwards, locally cutting out the alluvial fan deposits, although it is still regarded as being close to the original basin edge. The eastern margin is formed by a low-angle extensional fault, known as the Hornelen Detachment, part of the larger scale Nordfjord-Sogn Detachment (NSD). It juxtaposes the Devonian basin fill against mylonites of the NSD shear zone that underlies the basin.

== Origin ==
The Hornelen sequence, in common with other Old Red Sandstone sequences in Norway, Scotland and Greenland was originally described as deposited in an intermontane depression with most faulting being post-depositional. The first tectonic model for the basin was developed in 1964, with an eastward migrating depocentre proposed in a downthrown basin between two high-angle normal faults with sedimentation keeping pace with eastward propagation of the faults. In 1977 a strike-slip pull-apart basin model was proposed, by analogy with basins developed along the San Andreas Fault system, with the cyclicity explained as a result of periodic fault activity. In 1984 another extensional model was proposed and this was supported in 1986 by the recognition of the underlying Nordfjord-Sogn Detachment, a major extensional structure with tens of km of displacement.

== See also ==
- Solund Basin
- Kvamshesten Basin
