= Kvamshesten Basin =

Sedimentary basin in Norway

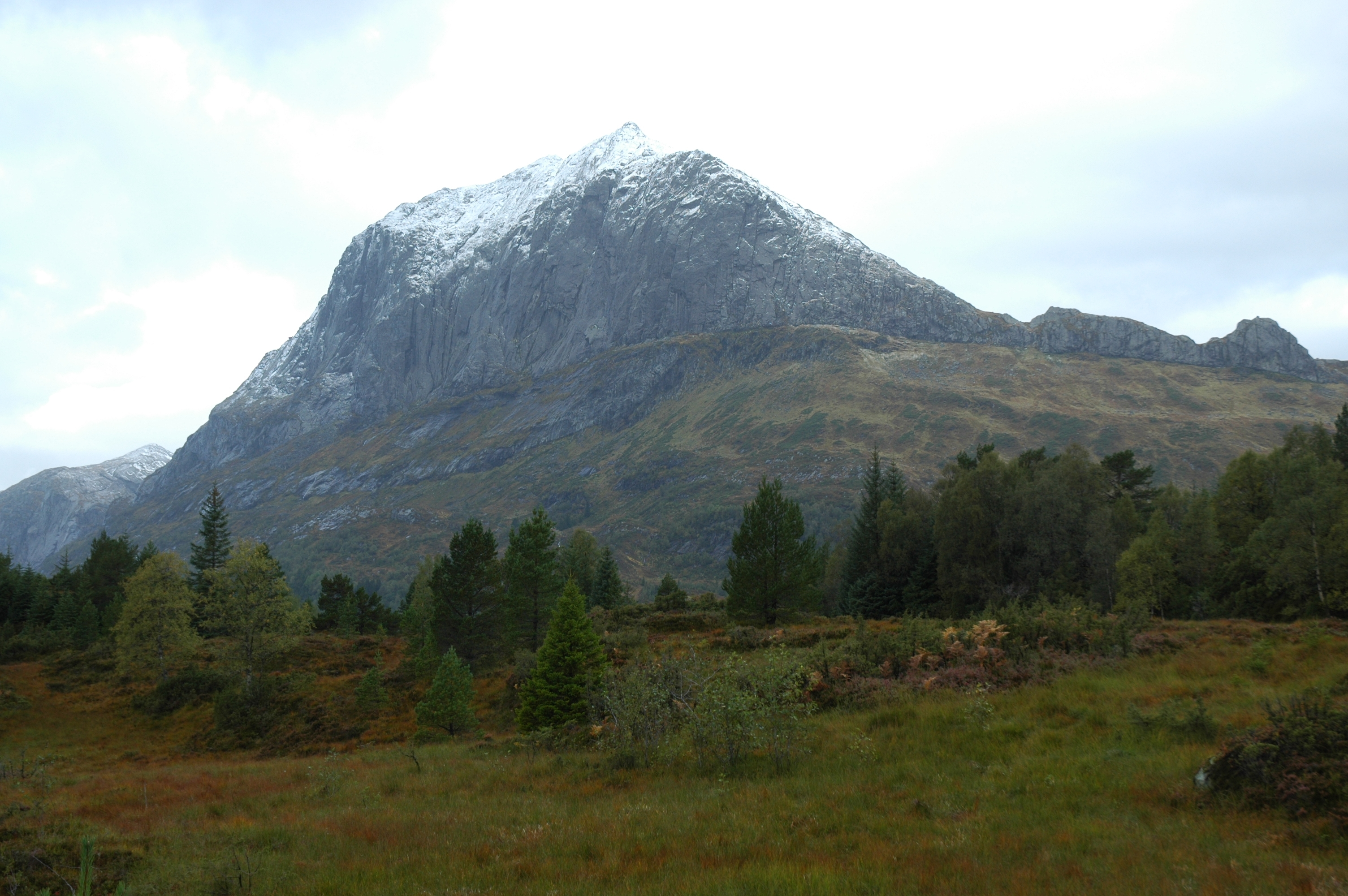
- The mountain of Kvamshesten (Storehesten), formed of Devonian conglomerates and sandstones above a sharp tectonic contact with mylonites of the Nordfjord-Sogn Detachment

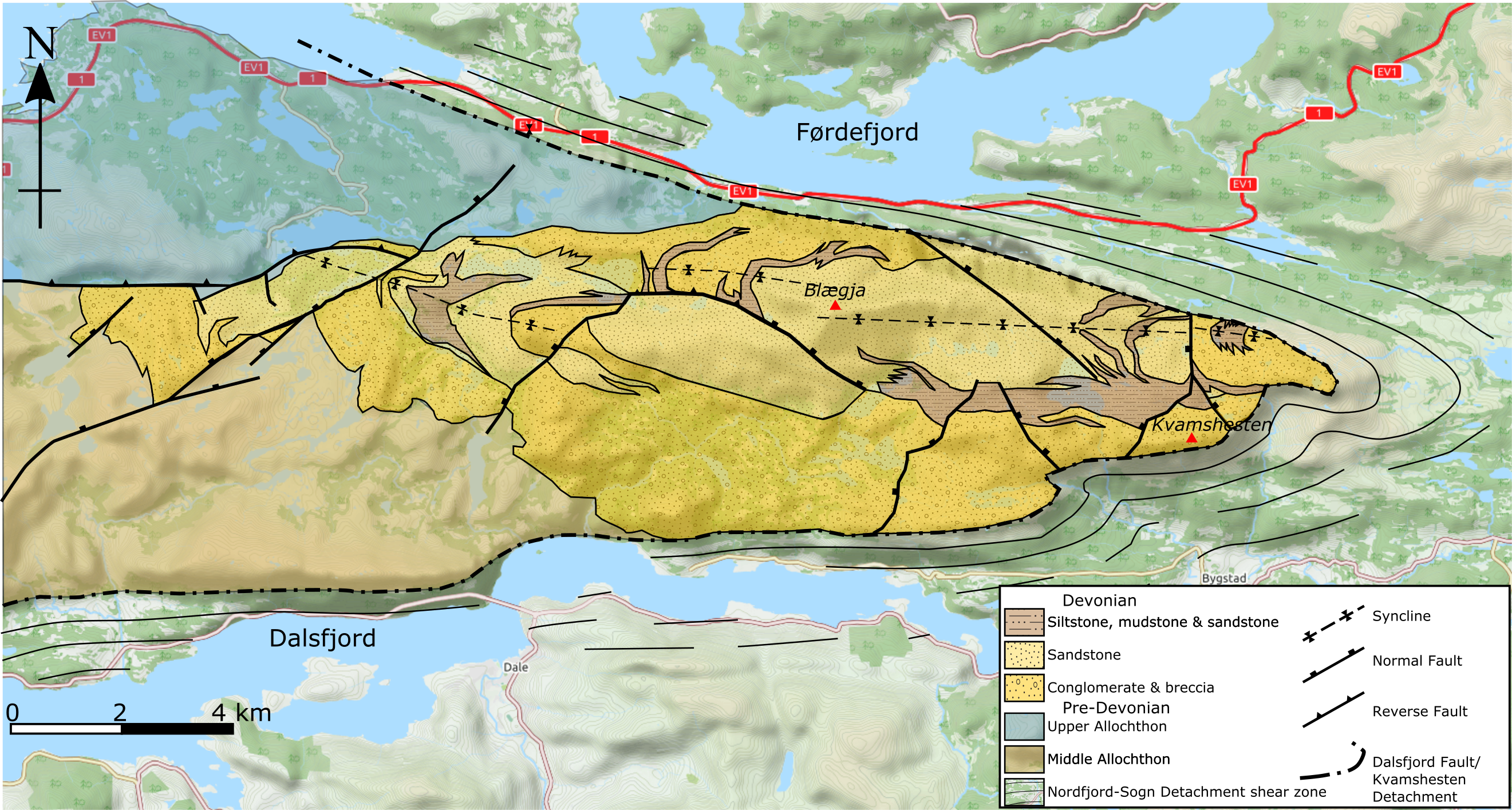
- Geological map of the Kvamshesten Basin
- Coordinates: 61.41°N 5.55°E
- Etymology: Kvamshesten
- Region: Vestland
- Country: Norway

Characteristics
- On/Offshore: Onshore
- Area: 75 km^{2} (29 sq mi)

Geology
- Age: Devonian
- Faults: Kvamshesten Detachment/Dalsfjord Fault

The Kvamshesten Basin is a sedimentary basin containing coarse continental clastic rocks of Devonian age. It is one of a series of basins of similar age in southwestern Norway found between Sognefjord and Nordfjord, developed in the hanging-wall of the Nordfjord-Sogn Detachment. It is named for the mountain of Kvamshesten.

== Tectonic setting ==
During the later part of the Silurian period, the western margin of the Baltic Plate was affected by the main collisional event of the Caledonian orogeny, known as the Scandian phase. This led to large-scale thrusting and the development of a mountain belt similar in scale to the Himalayas. Soon after the collision finished during the Early Devonian, the thickened crust began to extend. Initially the extension took place by reactivation of Caledonian thrust faults, known as Mode 1 extension. The uplift and exhumation led to a reduction of dip in these reactivated thrusts, making them progressively less mechanically viable. At this point Mode II extension took over, with development of large extensional shear zones that cross-cut the Caledonian thrust pile, such as the Nordfjord-Sogn Detachment.

== Basin fill ==
The northern margin of the basin is dominated by conglomerates and breccias deposited by alluvial fans. The southern margin is mainly conglomerate, while with the central axis of the basin is mainly sandstone. Between the marginal conglomerates/breccias and the axial sandstones, finer-grained sequences are locally developed consisting of mudstone, siltstone and fine-grained conglomerate.

== Structure ==
The overall dip of the Devonian sequence is to the east towards the tectonic contact with the Dalsfjord Fault (Kvamshesten Detachment). The whole sequence, the basement units beneath the unconformable contacts towards the western end of the basin, the detachment and the underlying highly deformed rocks of the shear zone formed by the Nordfjord-Sogn Detachment have a synclinal geometry, indicating north–south shortening.

The Devonian rocks are cut by a series of high-angle faults, most of them extensional in type with evidence of being active during sedimentation. These faults are confined to the hanging-wall of the underlying detachment fault. Some of these earlier extensional structures show evidence of reactivation as reverse faults.

Both the timing and the cause of the observed north–south shortening is uncertain. Suggestions that the shortening happened at the same time as the extension along the detachment, have been countered by there being no evidence of changes in the tightness of the folding with stratigraphic level and a lack of unconformities within the basin fill.

== See also ==
- Hornelen Basin
- Solund Basin
