= Detachment fault =

Geological term associated with large displacements

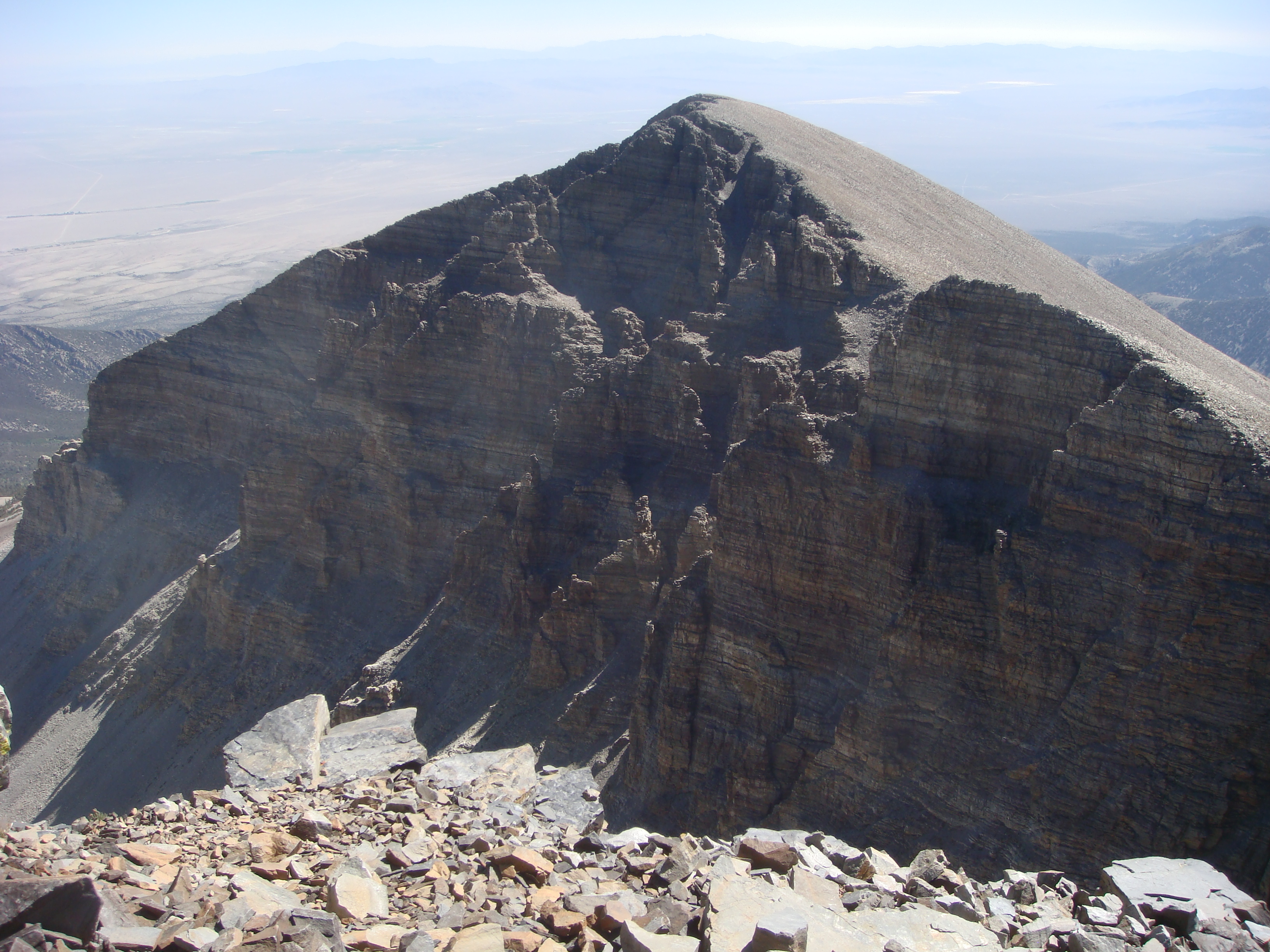
View of Doso Doyabi, Snake Range, Nevada, which was formed by detachment faulting.

A detachment fault is a gently dipping normal fault associated with large-scale extensional tectonics. Detachment faults often have very large displacements (tens of km) and juxtapose unmetamorphosed hanging walls against medium to high-grade metamorphic footwalls that are called metamorphic core complexes. They are thought to have formed as either initially low-angle structures or by the rotation of initially high-angle normal faults modified also by the isostatic effects of tectonic denudation. They may also be called denudation faults. Examples of detachment faulting include:

- The Snake Range detachment system of the Basin and Range Province of western North America which was active during the Miocene
- The Nordfjord-Sogn detachment of western Norway active during the Devonian Period
- The Whipple detachment in southeastern California

Detachment faults have been found on the sea floor close to divergent plate boundaries characterised by a limited supply of upwelling magma, such as the Southwest Indian Ridge. These detachment faults are associated with the development of oceanic core complex structures.

== Continental detachment faults ==
Continental detachment faults are also called décollements, denudational faults, low-angle normal faults (LANF) and dislocation surfaces. The low-angle nature of these normal faults has sparked debate among scientists, centred on whether these faults started out at low angles or rotated from initially steep angles. Faults of the latter type are present, for example, in the Yerington district of Nevada. There, evidence for rotation of the fault plane comes from tilted volcanic dikes. However, other authors disagree that these should be called detachment faults. One group of scientists defines detachment faults as follows:

The essential elements of extensional detachment faults, as the term is used here, are low angle of initial dip, subregional to regional scale of development, and large translational displacements, certainly up to tens of kilometres in some instances.

Detachments faults of this kind (initially low-angle) can be found in the Whipple Mountains of California and the Mormon Mountains of Nevada. They initiate at depth in zones of intracrustal flow, where mylonitic gneisses form. Shear along the fault is ductile at mid to lower crustal depths, but brittle at shallower depths. The footwall can transport mylonitic gneisses from lower crustal levels to upper crustal levels, where they become chlorititic and brecciated. The hanging wall, composed of extended, thinned and brittle crustal material, can be cut by numerous normal faults. These either merge into the detachment fault at depth or simply terminate at the detachment fault surface without shallowing. The unloading of the footwall can lead to isostatic uplift and doming of the more ductile material beneath.

Low angle normal faulting is not explained by Andersonian fault mechanics. However, slip on low angle normal faults could be facilitated by fluid pressure, as well as by weakness of minerals in wall rocks. Detachment faults may also initiate on reactivated thrust fault surfaces.

== Oceanic detachment faults ==
Oceanic detachment faults occur at spreading ridges where magmatic activity is not enough to account for the entire plate spreading rate. They are characterized by long domes parallel to the spreading direction (oceanic core complexes of the footwall). Slip on these faults can range from tens to hundreds of km. They cannot be structurally restored, as slip on the fault exceeds the thickness of oceanic crust (~30 km compared to ~6 km, for example).

While occurring at relatively amagmatic spreading centres, the footwalls of these detachment faults are much more influenced by magmatism than in continental settings. In fact, they are often created by 'continuous casting': new footwall is continually being generated by mantle or melt from a magma chamber as slip occurs on the fault. The lithology is dominated by gabbro and peridotite, resulting in a mineralogy of olivine, serpentine, talc and plagioclase. This is in contrast to continental settings, where the mineralogy is dominantly quartz and feldspar. The footwall is also much more extensively hydrothermally altered than in continental settings.

In contrast to many detachment faults in continental settings, oceanic detachment faults are usually rolling hinge normal faults, initiating at higher angles and rotating to low angles.
