= Metamorphic core complex =

Exposures of deep crust exhumed in association with largely amagmatic extension

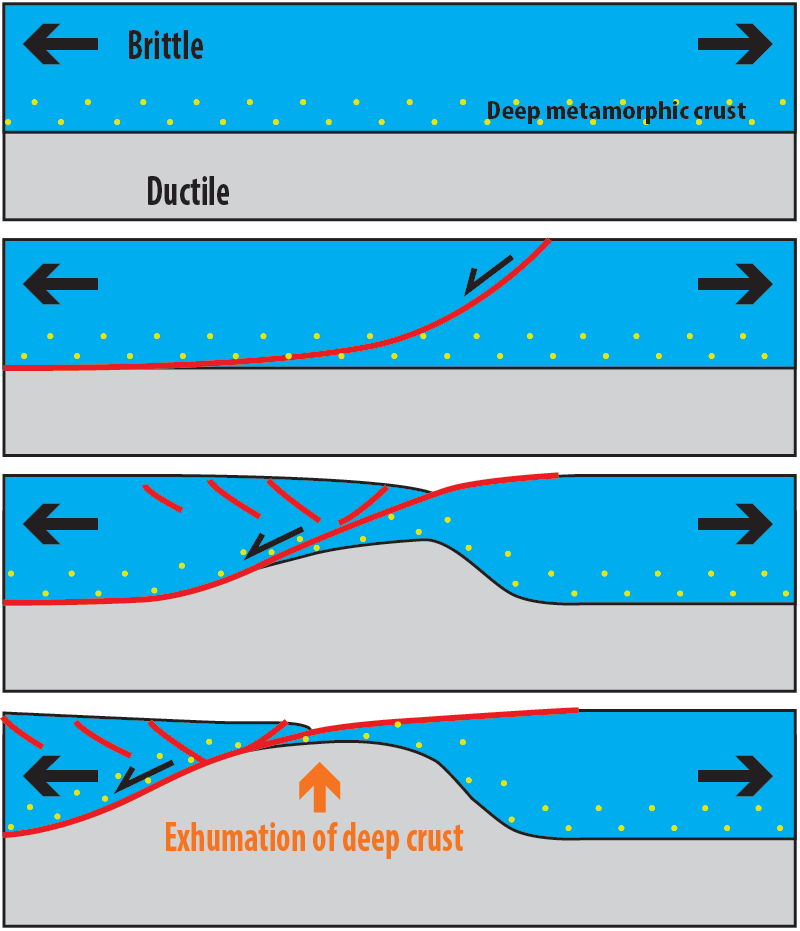
Formation of a metamorphic core complex

Metamorphic core complexes are exposed areas of deep crust brought to the surface by crustal extension (stretching). They form, and are exhumed, through relatively fast transport of middle and lower continental crust to the Earth's surface in the form of uplifting welts of hot rock and magma. The resulting doming causes the overlying rock to gravitationally collapse, sliding down and usually away from the uplift along low-angle detachment faults. Brittle, faulted cover rock above the detachment surface lies in direct contact with the ductile middle-lower crust below.

High-grade metamorphic rocks (eclogite-, granulite- to amphibolite- facies) are exposed below the detachment faults (and mylonitic shear zones). Amphibolite- to greenschist-facies, syndeformational metamorphism, and ductile-brittle to brittle deformation are shown on the upper-side (hanging-wall), with tilted geometries.

They range from several miles to over 50 miles across, and usually exhibit several miles of vertical uplift. They are common in areas of localized crustal extension in otherwise thickened fold-thrust belts. The origin of the low angles of the detachment faults were a subject of debate as of 2022.

== Descriptions ==
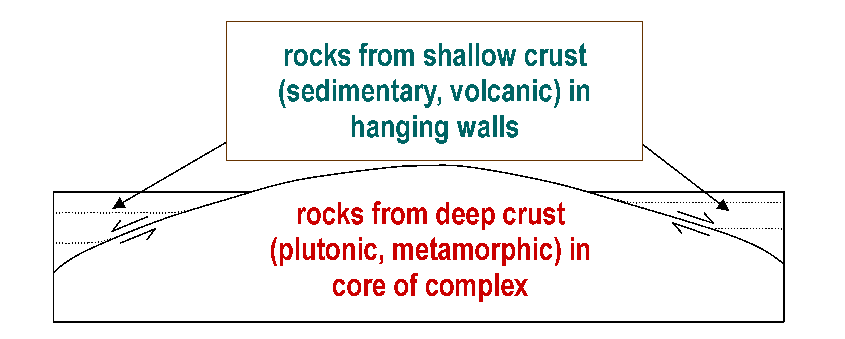
Simplified diagram of a symmetric metamorphic core complex

- Coney (1980) stated that they:

are characterized by a generally heterogeneous, older metamorphic-plutonic basement terrane overprinted by low-dipping lineated and foliated mylonitic and gneissic fabrics. An unmetamorphosed cover terrane is typically attenuated and sliced by numerous subhorizontal younger-on-older faults. Between the basement and cover terranes is a decollement and/or steep metamorphic gradient with much brecciation and kinematic structural relationships indicating sliding or detachment.

The decollement is also called a detachment fault.

- According to Lister and Davis (1989):

Metamorphic core complexes form as the result of major continental extension, when the middle and lower continental crust is dragged out from beneath the fracturing, extending upper crust. Movement zones capable of producing such effects evolve in space as well as with time. Deforming rocks in the footwall are uplifted through a progression of different metamorphic and deformational environments, producing a characteristic sequence of (overprinted) meso- and microstructures.

== Location ==
The core complex model was first developed in the cordillera of western North America, with older cores found in the north (Eocene), and younger to the south. The structures were first described by Peter Misch and his students in 1960. They were formerly called "cordilleran core complexes" after the region in which they were discovered. Globally, core complexes are thought to be found in the Aegean Sea, Anatolia, Iran, Tibet, north China, Slovakia, Venezuela-Trinidad (Miocene), New Zealand and West Antarctica. Core complexes are currently continuing to form in eastern New Guinea.

== Core complexes on other planets ==
A feature at the center of Artemis Corona on Venus has been suggested as a metamorphic core complex. This could be the largest metamorphic core complex in the Solar System.

== See also ==
- Northern Snake Range metamorphic core complex
- Oceanic core complex
