= Ernest Masson Anderson =

Scottish geologist

- Born: 1877; Falkirk
- Died: 1960 (aged 82–83); Edinburgh
- Education: Falkirk High School; High School of Dundee; University of Edinburgh
- Occupation: Geologist
- Employer: HM Geological Survey (Scotland)

Ernest Masson Anderson FRSE FGS (1877–1960) was a Scottish geologist.

Ernest was born in Falkirk and educated at Falkirk High School and the High School of Dundee before attending the University of Edinburgh, where he received a B.Sc. in 1897, an M.A. in mathematics and natural philosophy in 1898, and a D.Sc. in 1933.

He is known for his contribution to the dynamic analysis of faulting, set out in his book The Dynamics of Faulting and Dyke Formation with Applications to Britain (1951).

Anderson joined the Geological Survey of Great Britain in 1903 and remained with them until his retirement, except for his period of war service from 1916-1917. From 1922 to 1928 he was Senior Geologist to HM Geological Survey (Scotland).

He died in Edinburgh in 1960.

== See also ==
- Anderson's theory of faulting
