= Pseudotachylyte =

Glassy or very fine-grained type of rock

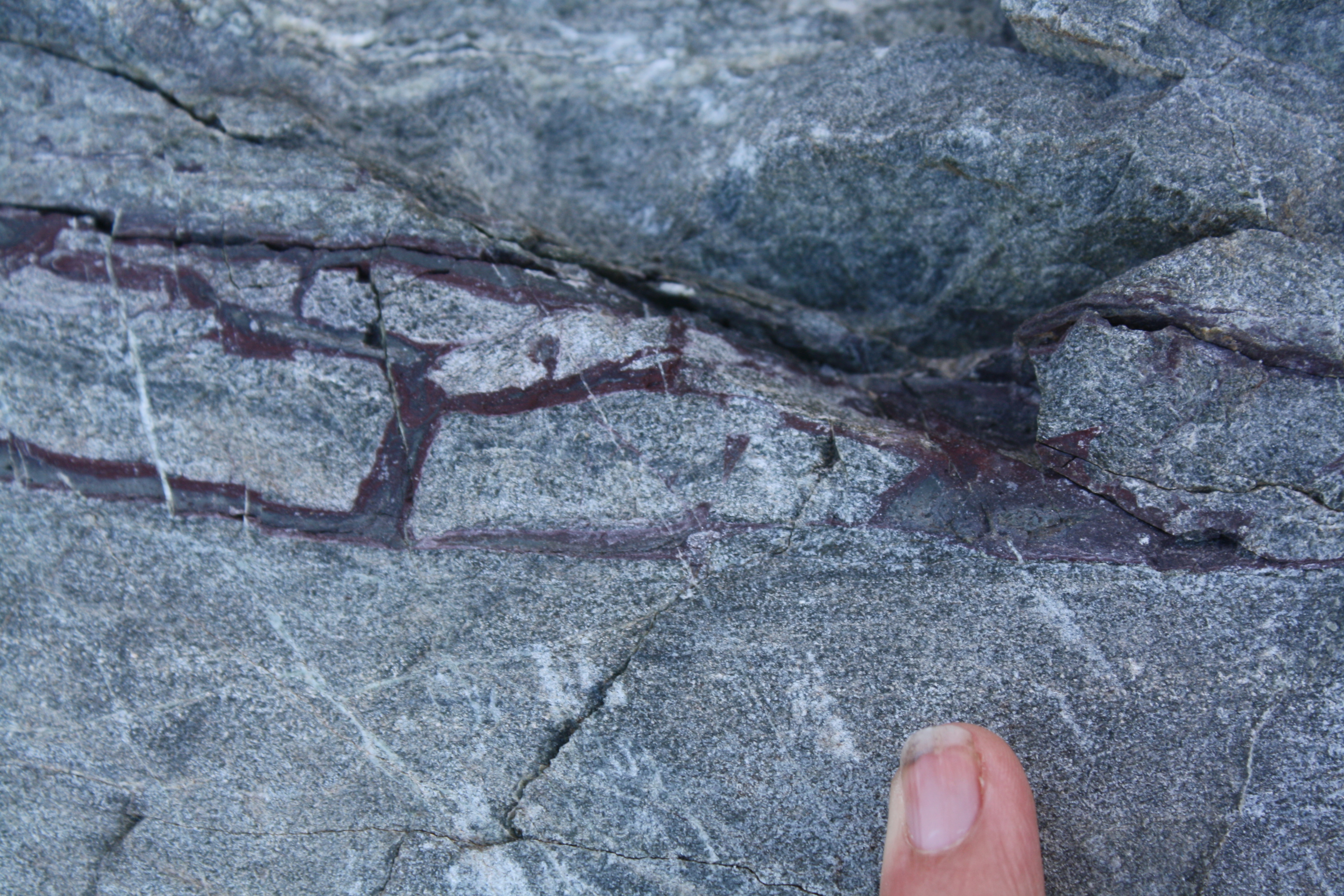
Purple and green pseudotachylyte veins in outcrop (Sierra Nevada Mountains, California)

Pseudotachylyte (sometimes written as pseudotachylite) is an extremely fine-grained to glassy, dark, cohesive rock occurring as veins that form through frictional melting and subsequent quenching during earthquakes, large-scale landslides, and impacts events. Chemical composition of pseudotachylyte generally reflects the local bulk chemistry, though may skew to slightly more mafic compositions due to the preferential incorporation of hydrous and ferro-magnesian minerals (mica and amphibole respectively) into the melt phase.

Pseudotachylyte was first documented by Shand in the Vredefort impact structure and was named due to its close resemblance to tachylyte, a basaltic glass. Though pseudotachylyte rocks are reported to have a glassy appearance, they are extremely susceptible to alteration and are thus rarely found to be entirely composed of glass. Typically, they are completely devitrified into a very fine-grained material with quench textures such as chilled margins, radial and concentric clusters of microcrystalites (spherulites) or as radial overgrowths of microcrystalites on clasts, as well as skeletal and spinifex microcrystalites.

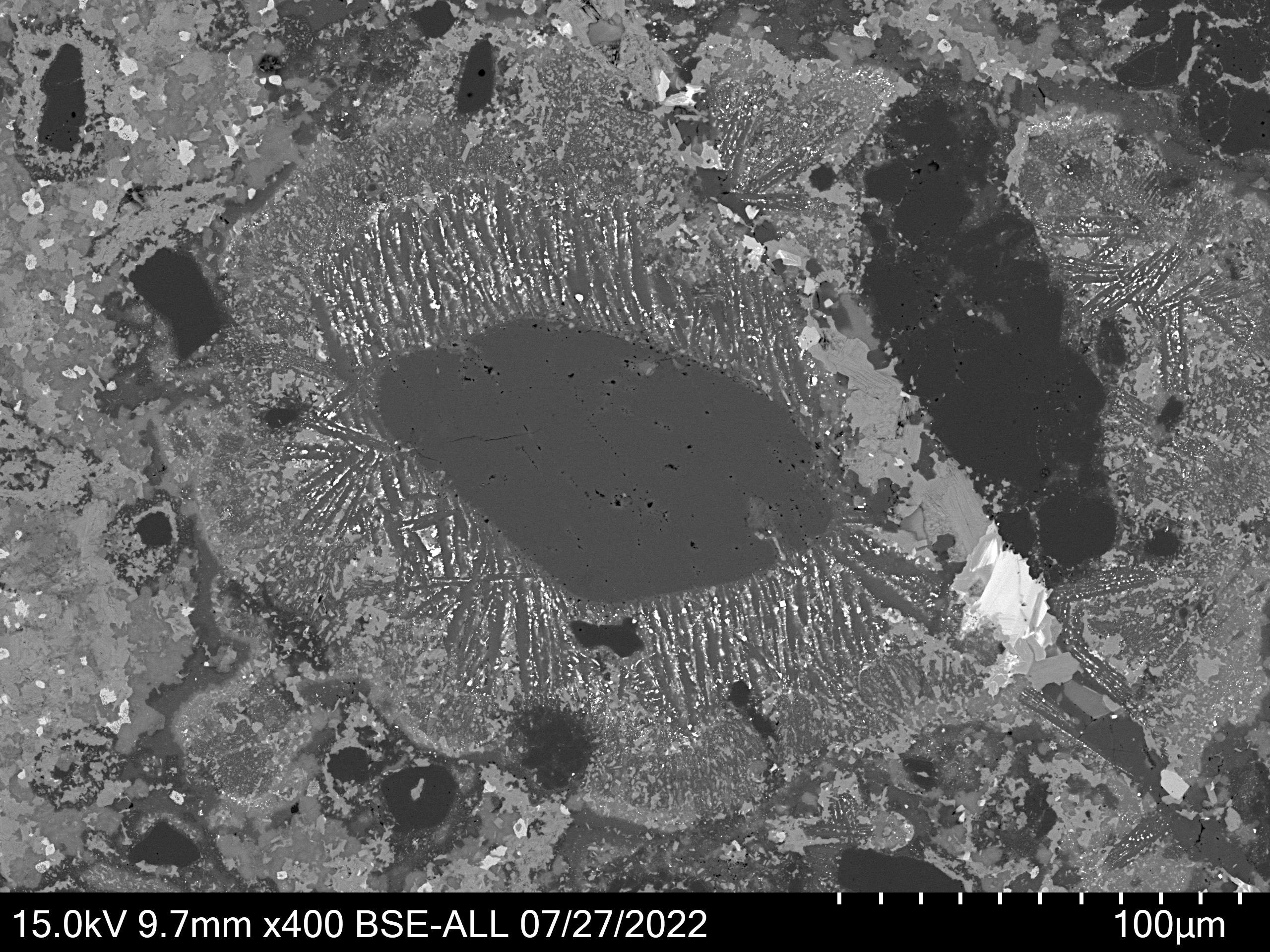
Radial overgrowth of plagioclase microcrystallite laths on plagioclase survivor grain in pseudotachylyte (Asbestos Mountain Fault, California)

== Formation ==
=== Seismic faulting ===
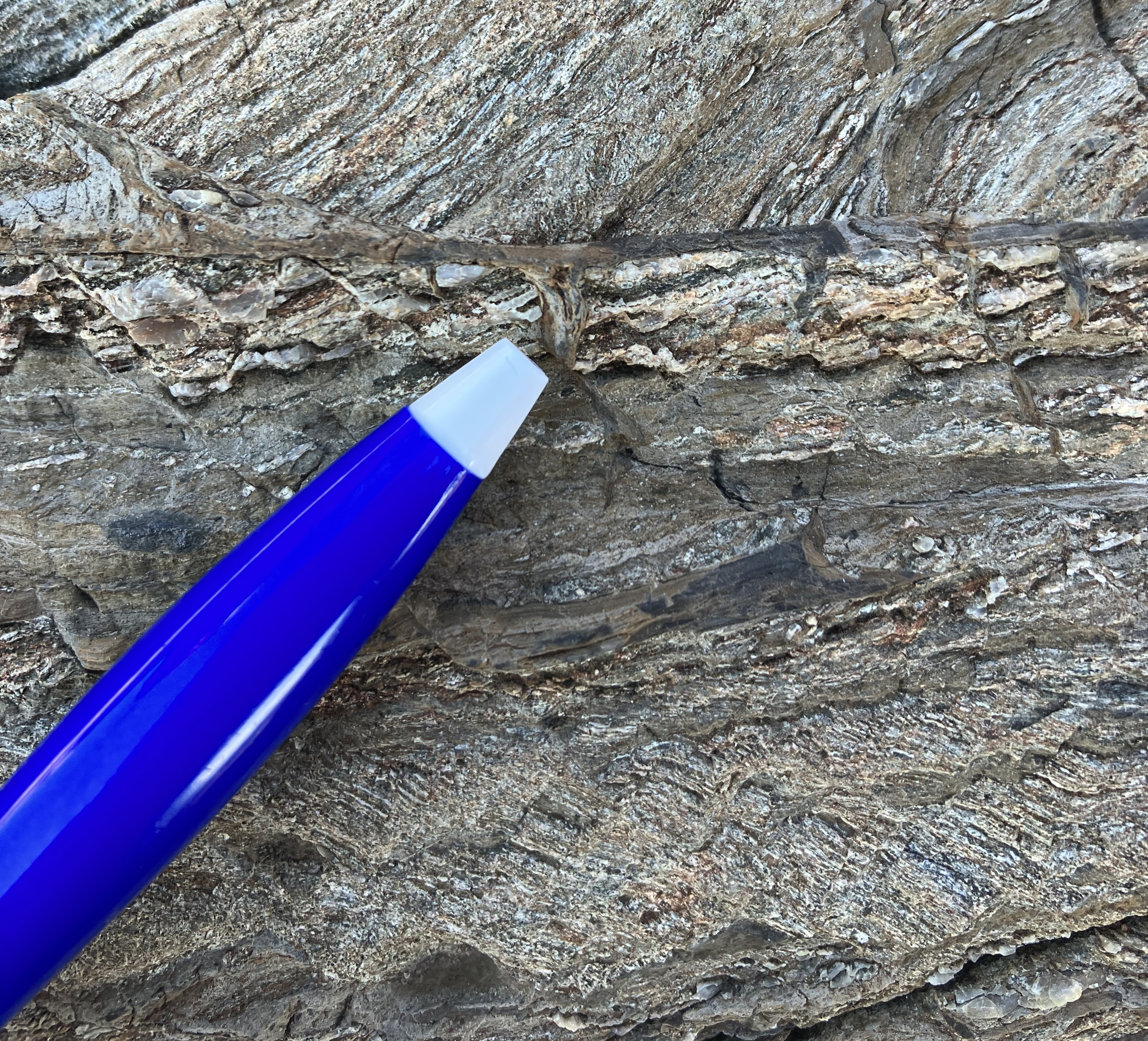
Seismic pseudotachylyte fault vein with several injection veins within mylonite (Fort Foster, Maine).

Pseudotachylytes have been referred to as "fossil earthquakes" as they represent definitive evidence of seismic slip. During seismic faulting (earthquakes), pseudotachylyte forms through an extreme concentration of frictional sliding onto a thin surface of a fault. The friction creates heat, and because rocks are insulators, the temperature increases on this surface allowing the rock to melt. This generates a "fault vein" which are often accompanied by "injection veins" that open from the fault vein as opening mode cracks. A melt origin for pseudotachylyte was controversial for some time, with some researchers favouring extreme comminution for their generation (crush-origin). Ample evidence of direct crystallisation from a melt though, has more or less put this argument to rest with most researchers defining pseudotachylyte as having a melt origin.

Laboratory experiments investigating how pseudotachylytes form have shown that the initial phase of formation involves the flash melting of asperities that eventually grow and join together into larger patches of a high viscosity melt. The high viscosity of these melt patches raises the fault's coefficient of friction, hindering sliding. As the patches of melt continue to grow and join together, they form a continuous melt layer with a lower viscosity, which reduces the fault's coefficient of friction, effectively lubricating the fault and allowing sliding to occur more easily. Once the melt layer has reached some critical thickness, frictional heat can no longer be generated, and the melt begins to quench and crystallise thus again increasing the melt's viscosity and begins acting as a viscous brake to sliding. Once sliding is stopped, the quenching of the melt layer welds the fault shut and restores its strength to that of the unfaulted surrounding rock.

==== Abundance of seismic pseudotachylyte in nature ====
There is an apparent lack of pseudotachylyte in the geologic record relative to the observed seismicity of today, which brings into question if this is an issue of the rarity of its production, lack of recognition in the field, or its ability to be preserved. It was once thought that pseudotachylyte could only be produced in dry, crystalline rock, this however, has been shown to be incorrect. Therefore, its production is likely not as rare as originally thought. Pseudotachylyte is often closely associated with other extremely fine grained rocks (e.g. mylonite and cataclasite), and is extremely prone to alteration that often renders it unrecognisable which supports arguments that pseudotachylyte production isn't rare, but rather is likely to go unrecognised, and thus unreported.

=== Landslides ===
Pseudotachylytes have been observed at the base of some large-scale landslide deposits. The formation of pseudotachylyte along the base of a landslide occurs due to the same processes as earthquake-generated pseudotachylyte - frictional heating during gliding along the base of the detachment melts the surrounding rock. They are similar in appearance to earthquake-generated pseudotachylyte. Some notable examples of landslide-generated pseudotachylyte in the geologic record is the Arequipa volcanic landslide deposit in Peru from approximately 2.4 million years ago, and the Langtang landslide deposit in Nepal which occurred between 30,000 - 25,000 years ago. Pseudotachylyte has also been found along the base of more modern landslides, such as the landslide generated by the 1999 Taiwan earthquake.

=== Impact structures ===
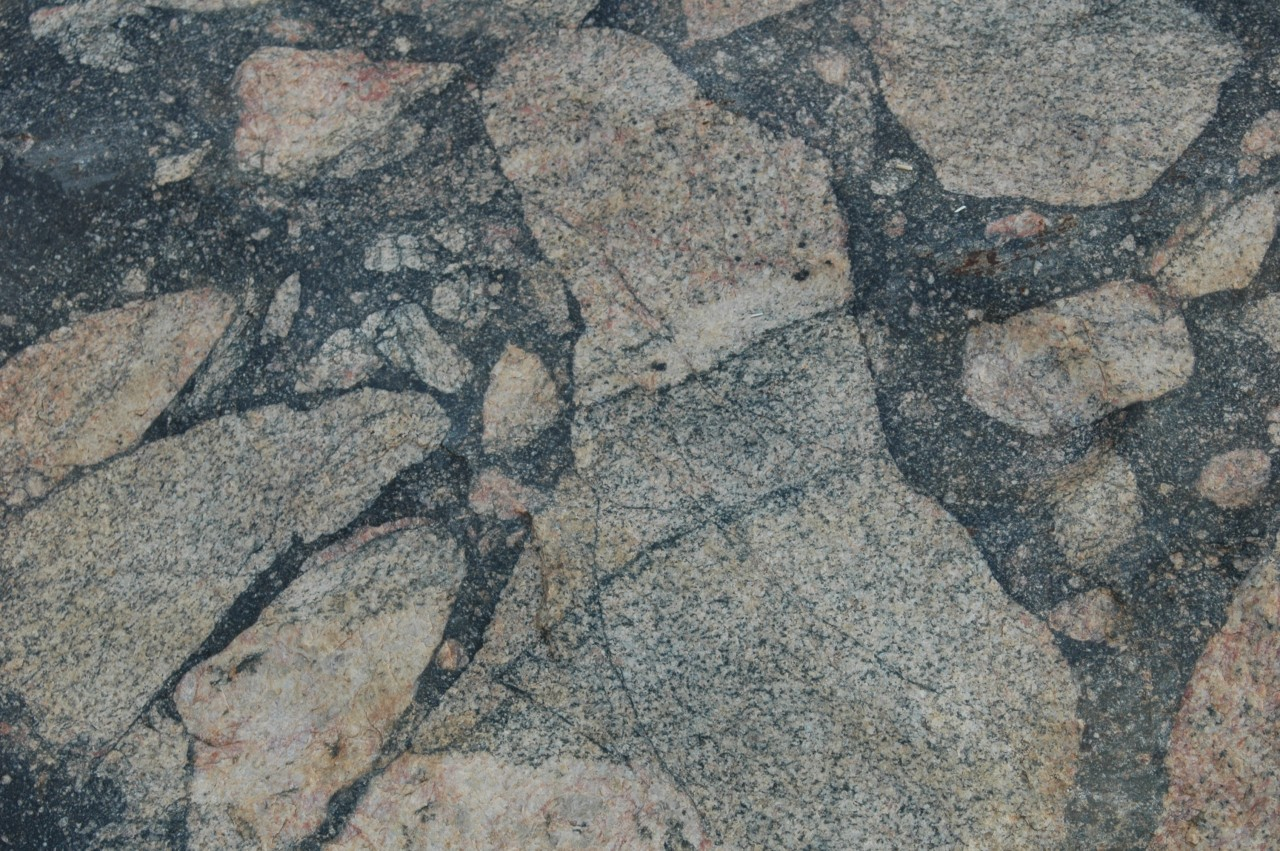
Pseudotachylyte breccia from Vredefort impact structure, South Africa

Pseudotachylyte has also been associated with impact structures. Pseudotachylyte in impact craters typically occurs as abundant irregular, anastomosing, and dike-like bodies that contain several large and small rounded inclusions of the impacted, or target, rock in a dense fine-grained to glassy black to greenish matrix. Individual pseudotachylyte bodies within impact craters are not uniform over long distances, and may change in size and shape drastically within meters or tens of meters. The most extensive examples of impact related pseudotachylytes come from impact structures that have been deeply eroded below the floor of the crater, such as in case of the Vredefort impact structure in South Africa, and the Sudbury impact structure in Canada.

Impact-generated pseudotachylytes are classified into two types depending on their method of formation. S-Type pseudotachylytes, also known as "shock veins", are found as small (<1 cm, typically <1 mm) glassy veins that contain high-pressure mineral polymorphs like coesite and stishovite. These shock veins are thought to form via frictional and shock melting due to the higher pressure compressive stages (%need to make it skip to formation section%) of the shockwave expansion. E-Type (endogenic) pseudotachylytes are formed via frictional melting of the target rock due to high-speed slip caused by the collapse of the crater margin.

==== Pseudotachylyte vs. impact melt in impact structures ====
Though pseudotachylyte and impact melt within impact structures are visually similar, both occurring as dike-like bodies, they are chemically different. Since pseudotachylyte is derived locally, it will reflect the composition of the wall-rock from which it formed. Impact melts are generated from a much larger volume of rock by instantaneous shock melting, so their chemical compositions will be more reflective of regional-scale mixing and homogenization during melting, particularly in heterogeneous terranes. In the Sudbury impact structure, researchers have been able to distinguish dikes of pseudotachylyte from dikes of impact melt based on their chemical compositions.

== See also ==
- Impactite – Rock created or modified by impact of a meteorite
