= Nordfjord-Sogn Detachment =

Zone of deformed rocks in Norway

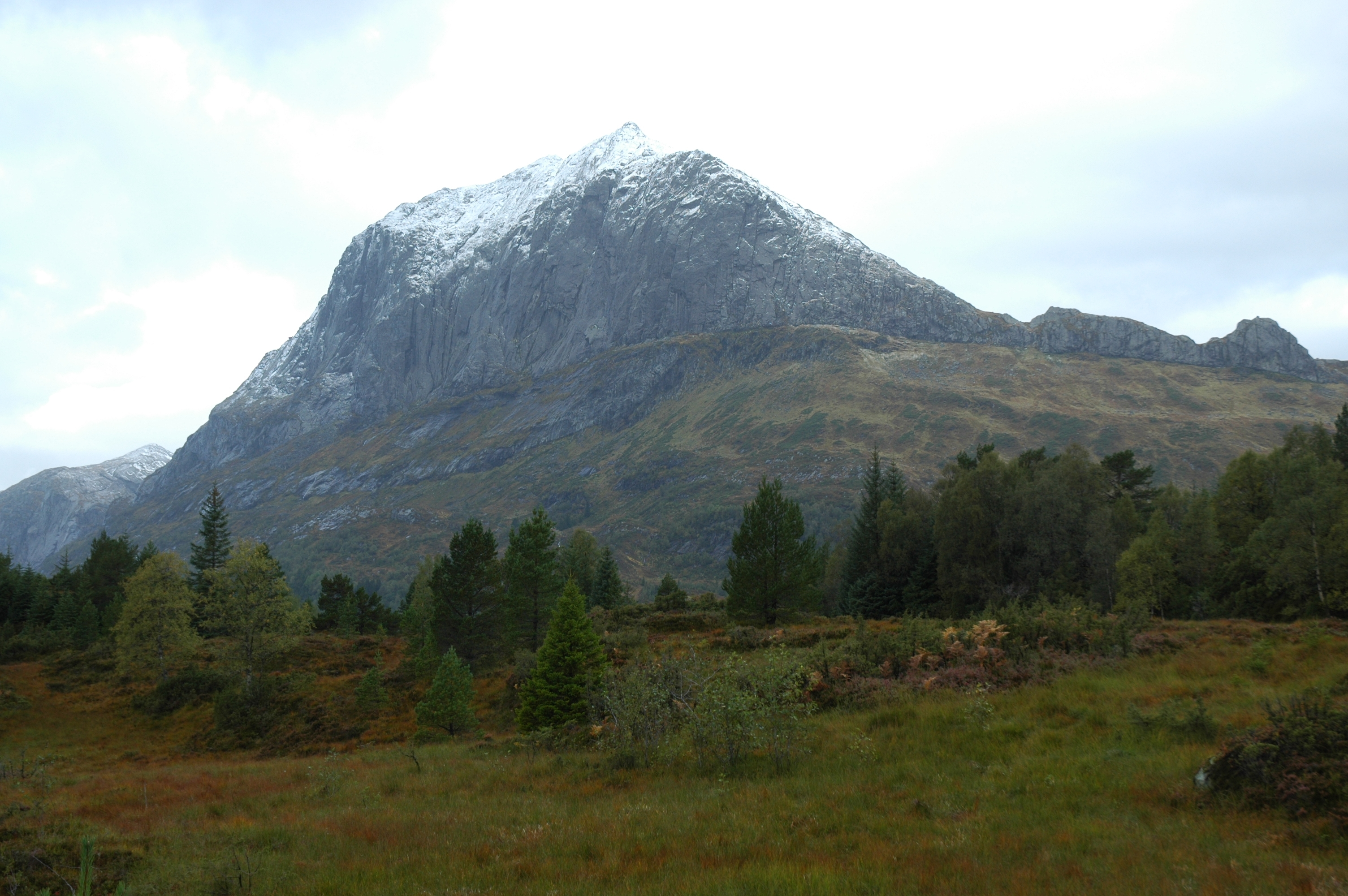
Low-angle fault contact between Devonian sediments of the Kvamshesten Basin and mylonites of the underlying shear zone

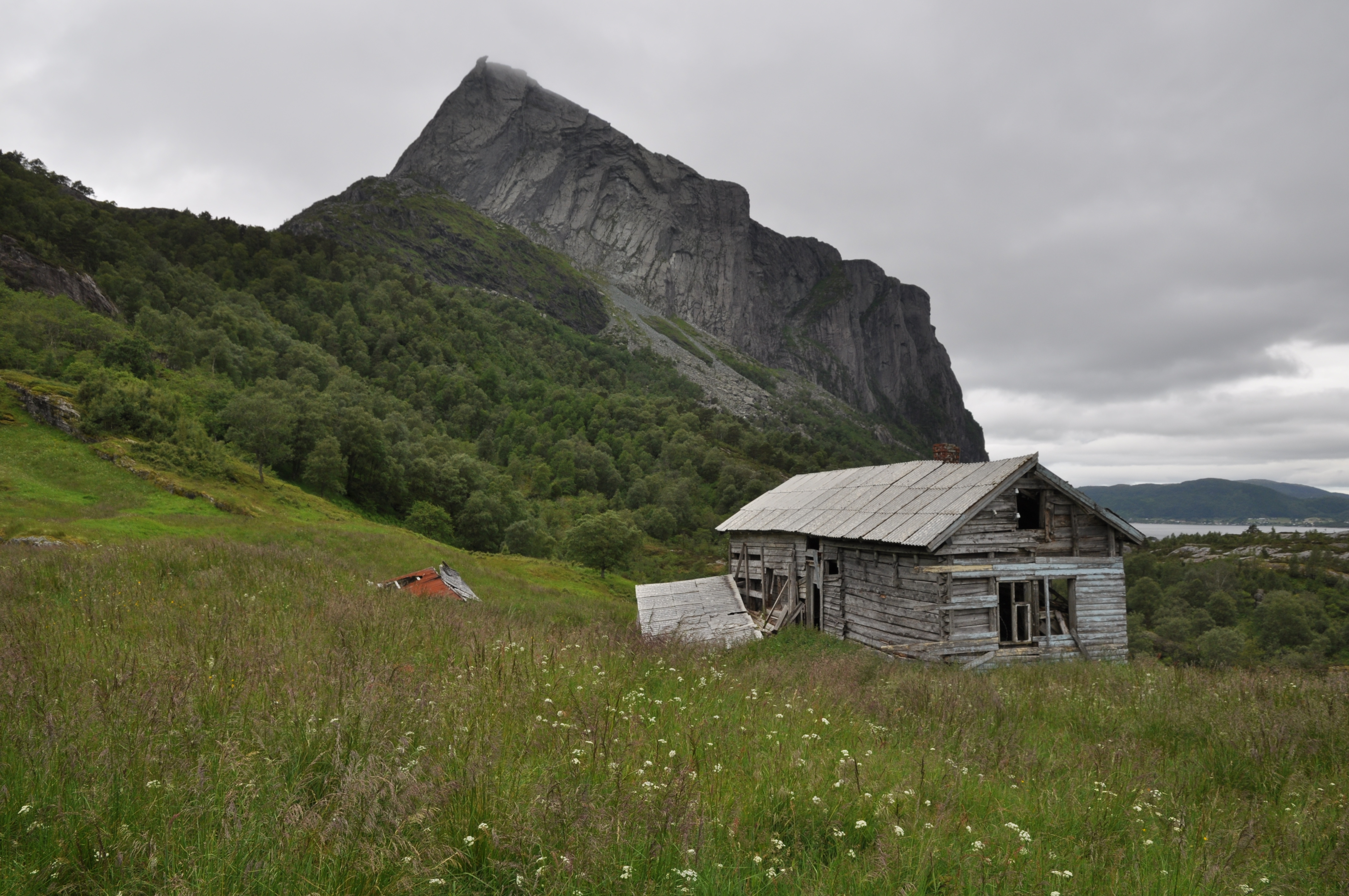
Lihesten near Hyllestad made of well-jointed Devonian conglomerates (part of the Solund Basin) in fault contact with mylonites of the detachment

The Nordfjord—Sogn Detachment (NSD) is a major extensional shear zone in Norway up to 6 kilometres (3.7 mi) in thickness, which extends about 120 kilometres (75 mi) along strike from the Nordfjord to the Sognefjord, bringing Devonian continental coarse clastic sedimentary rocks into close contact with eclogite facies metamorphic rocks of the Western Gneiss Region. It formed towards the end of the Caledonian Orogeny and was mainly active during the Devonian. It has an estimated displacement of at least 70 kilometres (43 mi) and possibly as much as 110 kilometres (68 mi). It was reactivated during the Mesozoic and may have influenced the development of fault structures in the North Sea rift basin.

== Extent ==
The NSD is recognised from the western end of the Sognefjord through to the northern shore of Bremangerlandet, a distance of about 120 kilometres (75 mi). The exposure is fairly continuous, broken occasionally by fjords and some later high-angle faults, such as the Standal Fault. There is evidence from seismic reflection data that the structure continues offshore to the west.

== Geometry ==
The NSD has an overall low westward dip, although its sinuous outcrop shows that it has a folded geometry with a series of west-plunging antiforms and synforms, with Devonian sediments preserved in four of the larger synforms as the Solund, Kvamshesten, Håsteinen and Hornelen basins. It places rocks of the Upper Plate in tectonic contact with rocks of the Lower Plate.

=== Bounding plates ===
The upper plate of the NSD consists of rocks of the highest tectonostratigraphic levels of the Norwegian Caledonides, the upper allochthon, unconformably overlain by conglomerates and sandstone of Devonian age.

The lower plate of the NSD is formed by the Western Gneiss Region.

=== The detachment ===
The detachment itself consists of a thick sequence of highly deformed rocks with both lithological banding and foliation parallel to the top of the zone. At the base of the zone, rocks of the Western Gneiss Region become progressively more reworked and more heavily deformed upwards, passing from protomylonite to mylonite. Towards the top of the zone it becomes an ultramylonite before that in turn becomes overprinted by brittle deformation structures, including veins of pseudotachylyte, with a thin zone of cataclasite marking the top. The base of the zone contains eclogites but the metamorphic grade of the mylonites decreases upwards from medium-grade (amhibolite facies), to low-grade (greenschist facies) near the top. The protolith of the mylonites changes from gneissic basement towards the base of the zone to sedimentary and volcanic towards the top.

== Cause ==
The NSD is one of the largest structures formed during the extensional late orogenic to post-orogenic collapse of the Caledonian mountain belt. This zone of thickened crust, which reached an estimated thickness of over 80 km, began to spread gravitationally during the Devonian period. This period of extensional tectonics affected most of the Caledonian belt, including Northern Scotland, East Greenland and Norway. In Norway, after initial reactivation of the larger thrusts in extension, the whole pile of Caledonian thrust sheets was cross-cut by a series of large extensional shear zones, including the NSD, the Hardangerfjord Shear Zone, the Karmøy Shear Zone and the Bergen Arc Shear Zone.

== See also ==
- Northern Snake Range metamorphic core complex
