= Steinsundøyna =

Island in Solund, Norway

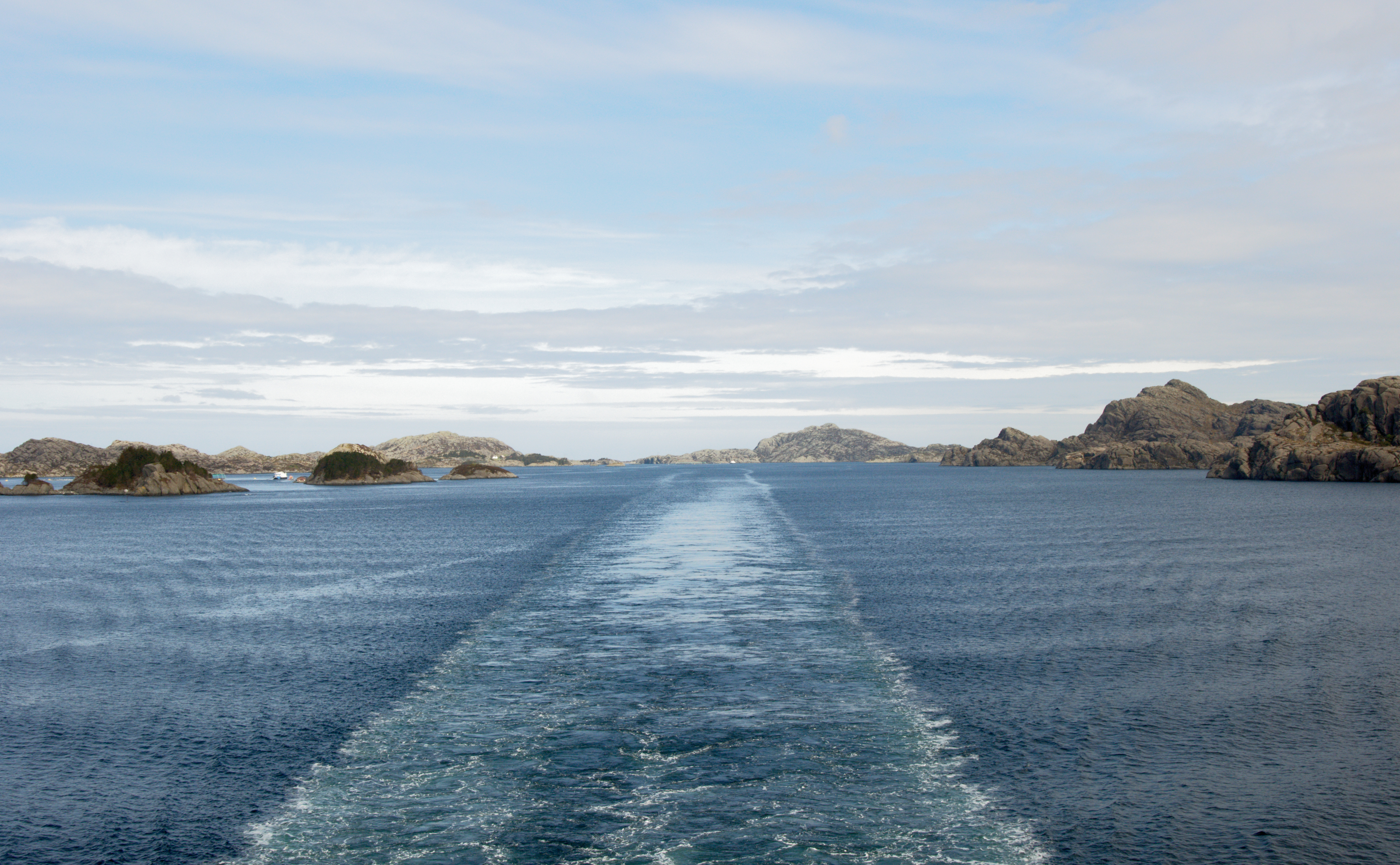
- The Steinsund strait between the islands of Steinsundøy and Rånøy, seen from the boat MS Nordlys
- Interactive map of Steinsundøyna

Geography
- Location: Vestland, Norway
- Coordinates: 61.0781°N 4.7744°E
- Area: 18.7 km^{2} (7.2 sq mi)
- Length: 9.5 km (5.9 mi)
- Width: 3.7 km (2.3 mi)
- Highest elevation: 315 m (1033 ft)
- Highest point: Vardefjellet

Administration
- Norway
- County: Vestland
- Municipality: Solund Municipality

Demographics
- Population: c. 55

Steinsundøyna is an island in Solund Municipality in Vestland county, Norway. The 18.7-square-kilometre (7.2 sq mi) sits on the north side of the Sognesjøen, at the mouth of the large Sognefjorden. The rocky island is virtually treeless (except in small, sheltered areas). In 2001, there were only about 55 residents on the island.

There is a road that crosses the island, connecting the islands of Ytre Sula (by ferry) and Sula (by bridge). The largest population centre on Steinsundøyna is the village of Steinsund on the eastern coast of the island, just across the strait from the village of Hardbakke on the island of Sula.

The strait between Steinsundøyna and the neighbouring island to the west, Rånøyna, is called Steinsund. Despite being less than 60 metres (200 ft) wide at the narrowest passage, ships can pass between the islands. For instance Hurtigruten ships pass that sound on their way from and to Bergen.

== See also ==
- List of islands of Norway
