= Anderson's theory of faulting =

Way of classifying geological faults

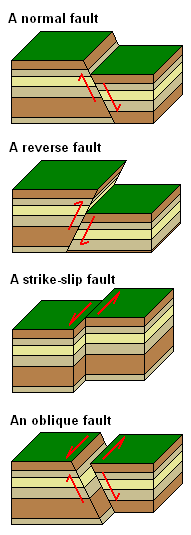
Types of faulting

Anderson's theory of faulting, devised by Ernest Masson Anderson in 1905, is a way of classifying geological faults by use of principal stress. A fault is a fracture in the surface of the Earth that occurs when rocks break under extreme stress. Movement of rock along the fracture occurs in faults. If no movement occurs, the fracture is described instead as a joint. The grinding of two rock masses against each another along a fault results in an earthquake and deformation of the Earth's crust. Faults can be classified into four types based on the kind of motion between the separated rock masses: normal, reverse, strike-slip, and oblique.

== Types of faults ==
While there are four types of faults classified by geologists today, Anderson's fault theory focuses on the explanation of three: normal, reverse, and strike-slip. Slip is known as the distance a plate has moved along the other. Because it cannot be known if one or both plates moved in the faulting process, this distance is classified as the distance one plate has moved relative to the other. Dip is defined as the angle of the fault relative to the surface of the earth, which indicates the plane on which slip will occur. Lastly, in any non-vertical fault, the block above the fault is called the hanging wall, while the block below the fault is called the footwall.

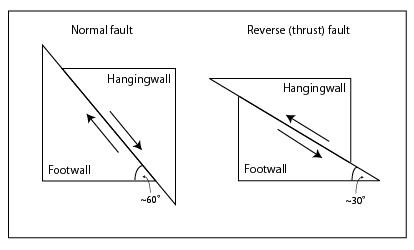
Normal and reverse dip-slip faults with labeled hanging wall and footwall

=== Normal faults ===
Normal faults, a type of dip-slip faults, occur when the hanging wall slips down the dip plane. They usually occur in response to tension creating the fracture and the following extension of the plane. See animation here

=== Reverse faults ===
Reverse faults are also known as thrust faults and are also another type of dip-slip faults. In this case, the hanging wall slips up the dip plane. Contrary to normal faults, these are caused by compression of the plane. See animation here

=== Strike-Slip faults ===
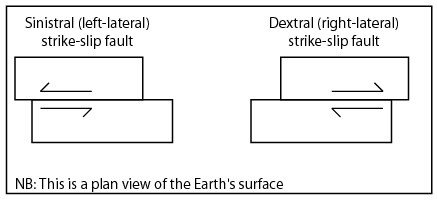
Lateral strike-slip faults

Strike-slip faults occur when the blocks slide against each other laterally, parallel to the plane. The direction of the slip can be observed from either side of the fault, with the far block moving to the left indicating a left lateral slip, and the converse indicating a right lateral slip. See animation here

=== Oblique faults ===
Oblique faults combine the vertical movement of dip-slip faults and lateral movement of strike-slip faults. They must have significant dip and strike components to be considered oblique. Anderson's fault theory does not consider oblique faults separately as they are a combination of already defined faults. Additionally, oblique faults do not obey Anderson's theory as they do follow the same scheme of principal stresses as the other fault types.

== Theory and principal stresses ==
Diagram of the three fault types showing the relative stress magnitudes

=== Stress ===
In geology, stress is defined as a force applied to a material. There are 4 types of stresses that rocks are subject to. First of which is when rock is pushed down by the weight of all the rocks above it, preventing it from moving. This is called confining stress and is predominant deep beneath the Earth's surface. The second type is compression. This occurs when rocks are squeezed together causing them to fold or fracture. While confining stress and compression stress both deal with rocks in a state of compression, the difference lies in that confining stress is a vertical stress, making it influenced by gravity. On the other hand, compression stress acts horizontally, parallel to the surface of the earth. Tension stress causes rocks to be pulled apart and is associated with the lengthening of a surface. Shear stress acts in the direction against motion as two parallel planes move against one another.

=== Principal stress ===
In Anderson's fault theory, the earth's surface is considered to be a collection of horizontal segments that connect to comprise one plane which experiences no shear stress parallel to itself. With zero shear stress, all other stress directions are maximized or minimized, making them principal stresses, normal to the principal planes. The theory models faulting in terms of these three principal stresses denoted as σ₁, σ₂, and σ₃. Two of these stresses are horizontal, on the plane, and one is vertical, normal to the plane, also known as S_{hmax}, S_{hmin} and S_{v}, respectively. All principal stresses are perpendicular to one another. Using geologic convention, σ₁ always indicates the dominant stress in any fault; therefore, it will be the stress that causes motion. σ₃ is the stress that directly opposes the motion caused by σ₁, therefore is the weakest principal stress. σ₂ is perpendicular to both σ₁ and σ₃ and in the cases of dip-slip and strike-slip faults will cause no motion in its direction, making it the second strongest principal stress.

=== Principal stresses and fault regimes ===
Anderson's theory classifies tectonic environments into three fault regimes based on their relationship with the principal stresses. σ₁ being the vertical stress is classified as a gravity regime because movement aligns with the force of gravity. This regime dominated by normal dip-slip faults. A vertical σ₃ is classified as a thrust regime. These are dominated by reverse dip-slip faults with σ₁ once again parallel to motion. The third regime is characterized by a vertical σ₂ and dominated by both left lateral and right lateral strike-slip faults.

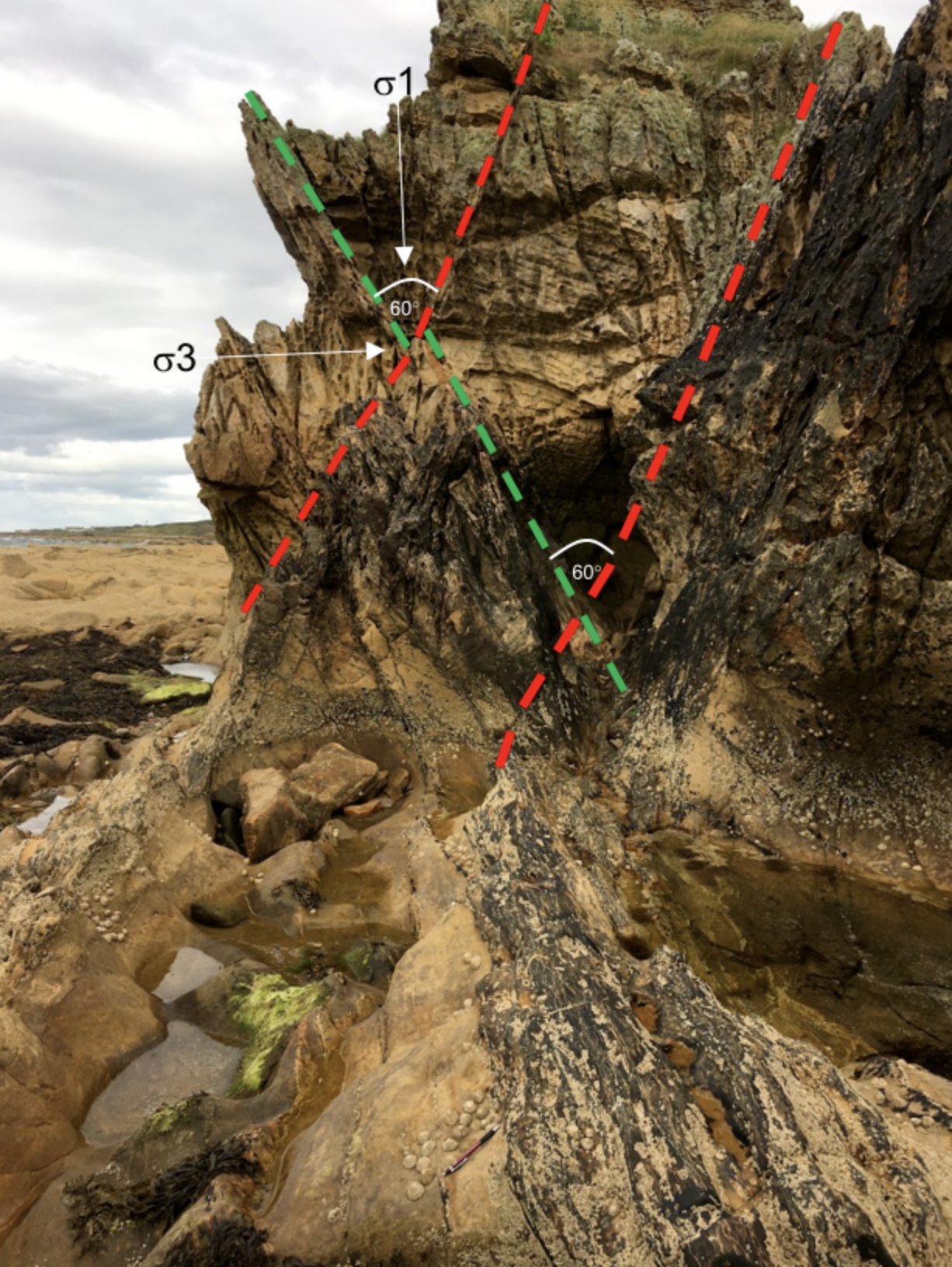
Observed normal fault dip angle

== Applications ==
Anderson's fault theory also presents a model for seismic interpretation. This model predicts the dip of faults according to their regime classification. Conjugate walls in any fault will share a dip angle with that angle being measured from the top of the hanging wall or the bottom of the foot wall. Gravity regimes are predicted to have a 60° dip, while thrust regimes have a dip angle of 30°. Wrench regimes have a 90° dip as there is no hanging wall. When approaching a fault of an unknown type, these prediction can be used to probable classification of the fault. Furthermore, when the type of the fault is known, actual measurements of dip can be compared to the predictions from Anderson's fault theory and reveal more about the geological landscape. For example, a normal fault with a dip observed to be not 60° would indicate the rotation of the plates which could indicate the presence of anisotropic materials, such as a salt layer, or a plane of weakness, which would indicate higher chances of geologic activity in that area in the future.
