= Northern Snake Range metamorphic core complex =

Zone of deformed rocks in Nevada

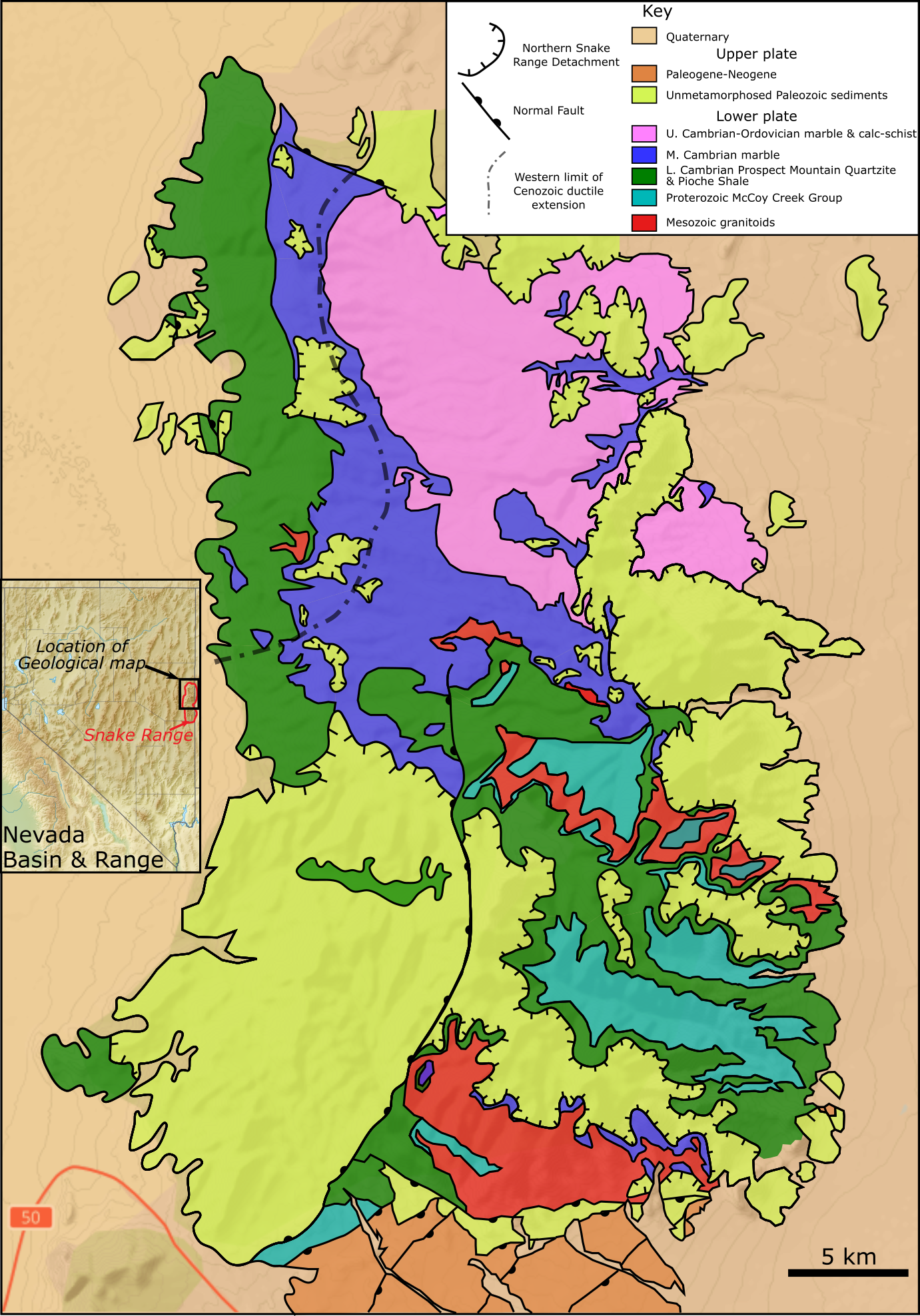
Geological map of the Northern Snake Range

The Northern Snake Range metamorphic core complex is a gently domed structure that forms the northern part of the Snake Range in Nevada. The metamorphic core complex consists of an upper plate of brittlely-faulted Cambrian to Permian mainly carbonate sedimentary rocks, unconformably overlain by Cenozoic volcanic and clastic rocks and separated from a lower plate of ductilely-deformed and metamorphosed Neoproterozoic to Cambrian sedimentary rocks, cut by Mesozoic to Cenozoic intrusions, by the intensely-deformed fault zone of the Snake Range Detachment (SRD). It was selected as one of the first 100 geological heritage sites identified by the International Union of Geological Sciences (IUGS) to be of the highest scientific value.

== Stratigraphy ==
The Northern Snake Range has a stratigraphy that is common to both the upper and lower plates, although the lowermost parts are missing from the upper plate and the upper parts from the lower plate. The full Neoproterozoic to Cenozoic sequence has an estimated original thickness of about 14,000 m. The lowest exposed part of the sequence is the Neoproterozoic McCoy Creek Group with an overall thickness of about 4,000 m, consisting mainly of quartzites with some interbedded mudstones (now metamorphosed to schists). Conformably above this is the Lower Cambrian Prospect Mountain Quartzite. The rest of the pre-Cenozoic sequence, from the uppermost Lower Cambrian to the Permo-Triassic, consists mainly of limestones and dolomites with subsidiary amounts of interbedded shale, siltstone and sandstone. The entire sequence below the unconformable base of the Cenozoic strata was deposited in a continental shelf setting. After a major hiatus, a sequence of Oligocene clastic rocks with rhyolitic lavas and tuffs were deposited.

== Geometry ==
The overall geometry of the Northern Snake range metamorphic core complex is a gentle dome, elongated south to north. Erosion of the central part of the uplifted dome has exposed metamorphic rocks of the lower plate in the core of the structure.

=== Upper plate ===
Rocks of the upper plate are preserved at the edges of the dome. They are highly faulted, with at least two generations of extensional faults observed. These fault sets merge downwards into the underlying detachment fault.

=== Lower plate ===
Rocks of the lower plate are exposed in the central part of the dome. They show the effects of significant ductile deformation apart from the western edge of the complex. Both the amount of ductile deformation and the nature of the strain varies continuously across the complex from west to east. In the west the strain approximates to pure shear (combined vertical thinning and horizontal extension) with units retatining about 40% of their original thickness. Towards the east the amount of strain increases, with thinning reaching a value of 10% at the eastern part of the range and strain becomes dominated by simple shear, consistent with a down-to-the-east sense of shear.

=== Detachment ===
The northern Snake Range Detachment (or Decollement) is interpreted to be a major down to the east-southeast fault zone.

== Estimates of extension ==
The amount of extension on the Snake Range Detachment has been estimated in two ways. The restoration of faulted blocks within the upper plate has given a range of estimates, from 15.5 km to 24.3 km. Additional information comes from the restoration of fault blocks in the ranges just to the west of the northern Snake Range, which have been interpreted to represent part of the low-angle breakaway fault system for the detachment. A total extension of at least 36 km has been estimated for this system, feeding into the detachment. Other estimates come from the amount of ductile strain measured within the rocks of the lower plate, particularly the observed thinning of the Prospect Mountain Quartzite. This approach gives an estimated extension of 30±14 km.

== Estimates of lower plate burial ==
The two methods of calculating the maximum burial of the lower plate rocks give contradictory results. Estimates from mineral assemblages and mineral chemistry of maximum pressures and temperatures (geothermobarometry), give burial depths in the range 20–30 km. In contrast, given the total known stratigraphic thickness, such a degree of burial would require the presence of major thrust sheets repeating this stratigraphy that have since been eroded, for which there is currently no evidence, either from the northern Snake Range itself or from adjacent parts of eastern Nevada. It has been proposed that the discrepancy between the two estimates can be explained using the concept of "tectonic overpressure". In this model, the very high pressures are a result of high pore fluid pressures that have been confined within the lower plate. A large recumbent fold has been identified within the lower plate on the eastern side of the range. A reconstruction of this fold in the Late Cretaceous, before the onset of extension, gives a maximum burial of the McCoy Creek Group at that time of 19 km, sufficient to explain the presence of kyanite in these rocks but not to explain proposed burial estimates of up to 30 km.

== Constraints on age of formation ==
The precise timing of extension in the northern Snake Range remains uncertain. The radiometric dating of two sets of rhyolitic dikes provides some constraints. The first swarm was emplaced before or possibly during ductile extension and samples from three dikes give an age in the range 37.5–37.8 Ma (million years ago). Samples from a single dyke that was intruded after ductile strain and shows no signs of subsequent deformation give an age of 22.49 Ma. Combined with observed field relationships and cooling histories for the lower plate, this suggest that extension started in the late Eocene, continuing into the middle Miocene.

== Models of formation ==
The nature of the boundary between the upper and lower plates has been debated over the years, with both a shear zone detachment model and an exhumed brittle-ductile transition zone being proposed.

== See also ==
- Nordfjord-Sogn Detachment
