= Orogenic collapse =

Thinning and spreading of a thickened crust

Orogenic collapse is the thinning and spreading of thickened crust

In geology, orogenic collapse is the thinning and lateral spread of thickened crust. It is a broad term referring to processes which distribute material from regions of high gravitational potential energy to regions of low gravitational potential energy. Orogenic collapse can begin at any point during an orogeny due to overthickening of the crust. Post-orogenic collapse and post-orogenic extension refer to processes which take place once tectonic forces have been released, and represent a key phase of the Wilson Cycle, between continental collision and rifting.

== Description ==
Orogens (also known as orogenic belts, or more simply mountain ranges) are sections of thickened crust which are built up as tectonic plates collide. The thickening of the crust marks the start of an orogeny, or "mountain building event." As the orogeny progresses, the orogen may start spreading apart and thinning. Collapse processes can begin either once the orogeny ends as the tectonic forces cease, or during the orogeny if the crust becomes unstable.

There are two primary mechanisms at work in an orogenic collapse: excess gravitational potential energy and heat flow into the thickened crust. Overthickened crust can become brittle and begin collapsing and spreading under its own weight. The added weight from the thickened crust also causes it to sink deeper into the mantle, where additional heat can flow into the crust. The added heat softens the rock and makes it flow more easily, which can allow material in deeper sections to move up into thinner areas via buoyancy forces, reducing the total thickness. Orogens can also be destroyed by eduction and erosion, but these processes are not necessarily associated with orogenic collapse. It has been argued that extension during orogenic collapse is a more effective mechanism of lowering mountains than erosion.

== Models ==
Orogenic collapse can occur under different circumstances

=== Fixed-boundary collapse ===
A fixed-boundary collapse is the breakdown of the brittle upper crust and occurs when crust has overthickened while tectonic forces are still active. Flow in the lower crust may or may not occur when this happens. This can lead to exhumation of buried features.

=== Free-boundary collapse ===
Free-boundary collapse occurs when tectonic forces have been released and the thickened crust is free to move. This results in both the extension of the surface crust and flow of the lower crust to thinner regions. The surface expression of the extension can include extensive normal faulting. This type of deformation has been compared to leaving a piece of Camembert cheese out overnight: as the cheese starts to sag and spread, the rind will eventually crack and split.

== Examples ==
=== Caledonian orogeny ===
The Scandinavian Caledonides is an example of an orogeny and mountain chain that reached heights of 8–9 km and then collapsed in the Devonian, forming major extensional structures such as the Nordfjord-Sogn Detachment. The collapse was such that the modern Scandinavian Mountains do not owe their height to the former orogeny but to other processes that occurred in the Cenozoic.

=== Basin and Range Province ===
The Basin and Range Province of the Western United States was previously a high plateau within the American Cordillera, which has since been extended and thinned. The characteristic topography is caused by the crust breaking up into fault blocks as a result of the extension. The cause of the extension is debated, though it is likely related to the transition from a subduction zone to a transform boundary between the North American and Pacific plates, as well as possible mantle upwelling.

=== Aegean Sea Plate ===
The Aegean Sea Plate is a section of continental crust which has been thinned, and is considered a high plateau between the Mediterranean and the Black Sea. The northern part of the plate underwent the Aegean orogeny (c. 70 - 14 Ma), followed by crustal extension and thinning due to slab rollback of the African Plate.

=== Variscan orogeny ===
The Variscan orogeny was a result of the collision between the Laurussia and Gondwana plates during the formation of Pangaea. This resulted in a high plateau of thickened crust. c. 345 - 310 Ma, the northward subducting slab began retreating southward, resulting in the thickened crust beginning to thin from a combination of gravitational collapse, fault detachment, and softening of the crust due to added heat.

=== Tibetan Plateau ===
Although the Tibetan Plateau is in a primarily compressional environment caused by the collision of the Indian and Eurasian plates, it is also experiencing east–west extension which began c. 14 Ma. The primary cause of this extension is likely gravitational collapse of the plateau from excess gravitational potential energy, as well as possible basal shearing as the Indian plate subducts under Tibet.
