= Baltic plate =

Ancient tectonic plate from the Cambrian to the Carboniferous Period

The Baltic plate was an ancient tectonic plate that existed from the Cambrian Period to the Carboniferous Period. The Baltic plate collided against Siberia, to form the Ural Mountains about 280 million years ago. The Baltic plate, however, fused onto the Eurasian plate when the Baltic plate collided against Siberia when the Ural Mountains were completely formed. The Baltic plate contained Baltica and the Baltic Shield which is now located in Norway, Sweden and Finland.
