= Mylonite =

Metamorphic rock

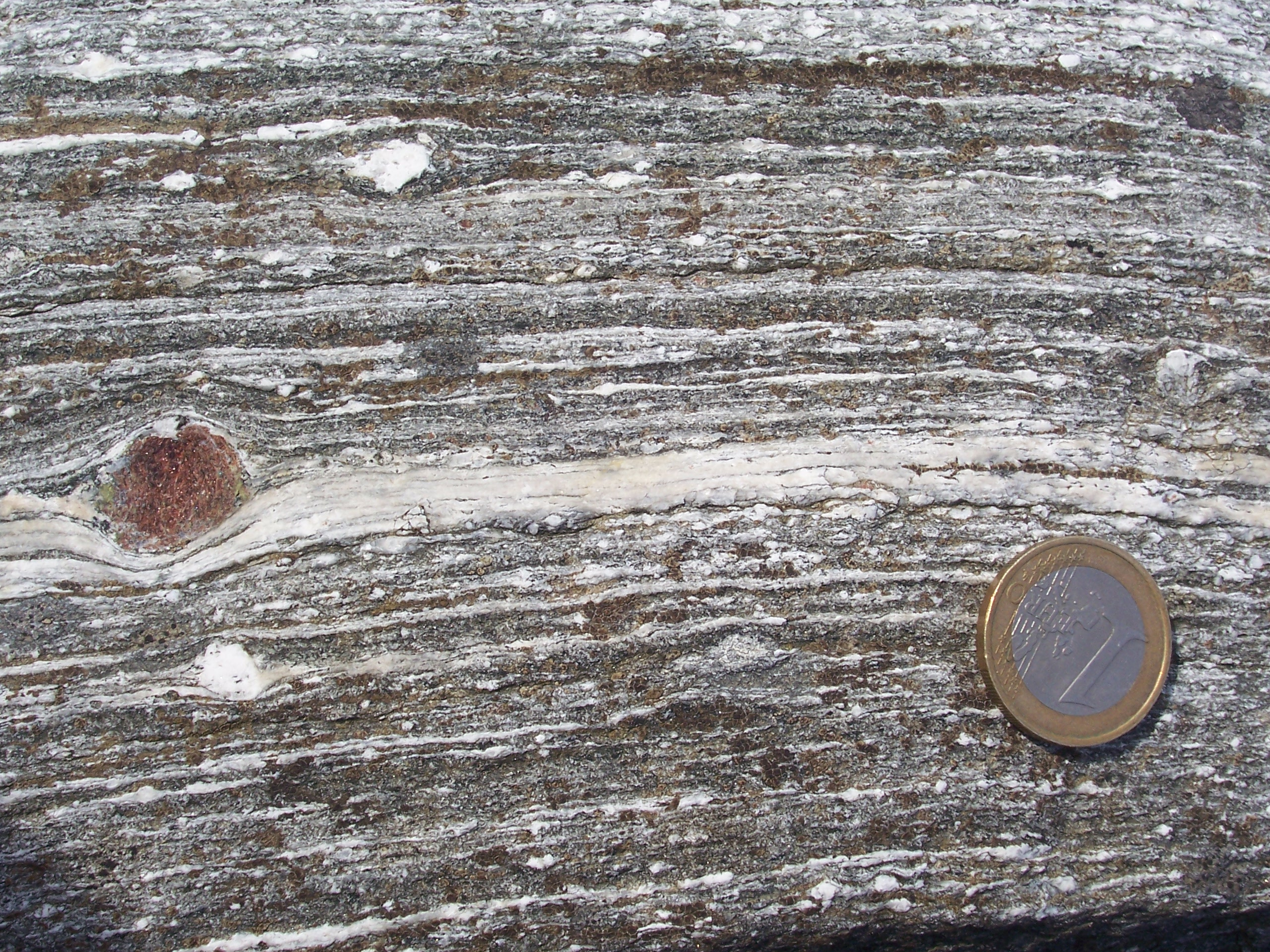
An amphibolitic mylonite showing a number of (rotated) porphyroclasts: a clear red garnet left in the picture while smaller white feldspar porphyroclasts can be found all over. Location: the tectonic contact between the (autochthonous) Western Gneiss Region and rocks of the (allochthonous) Blåhø nappe on Otrøy, Caledonides, Central Norway.

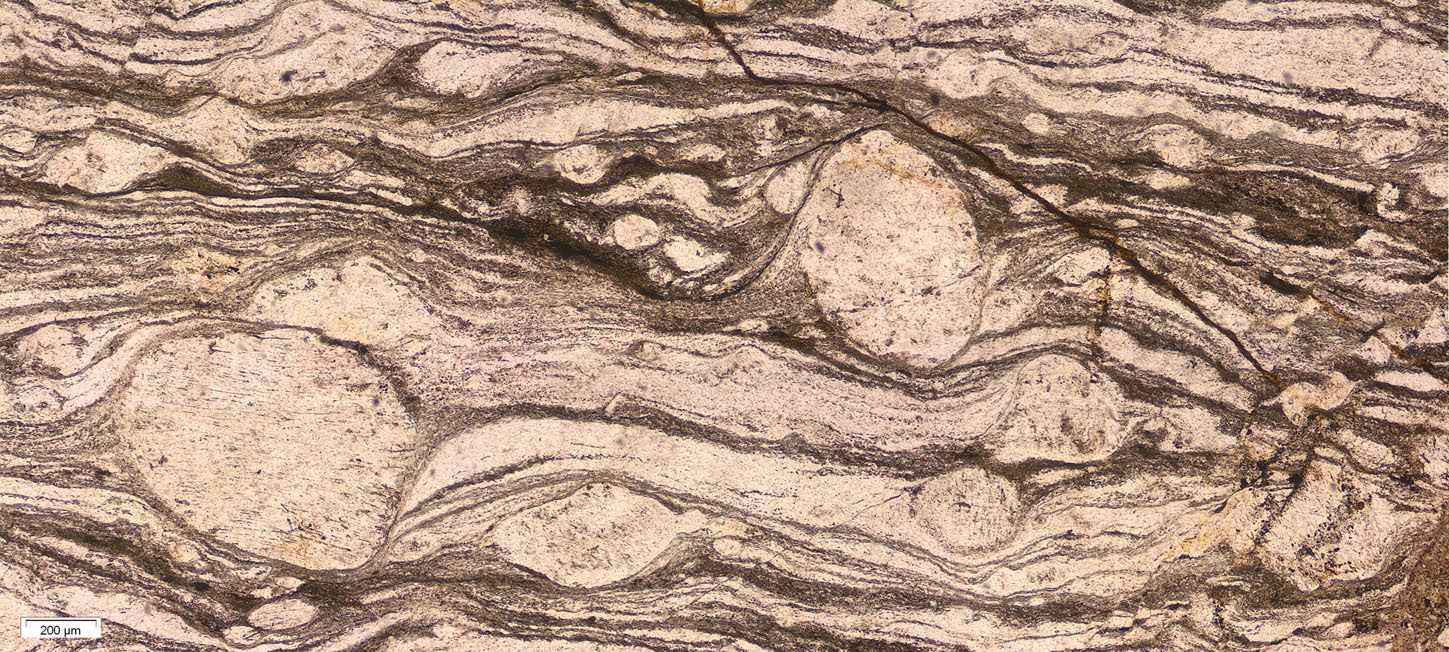
A mylonite (through a petrographic microscope) showing rotated so-called δ-clasts. The clasts show that the shear was dextral in this particular cut. Strona-Cenery zone, Southern Alps, Italy.

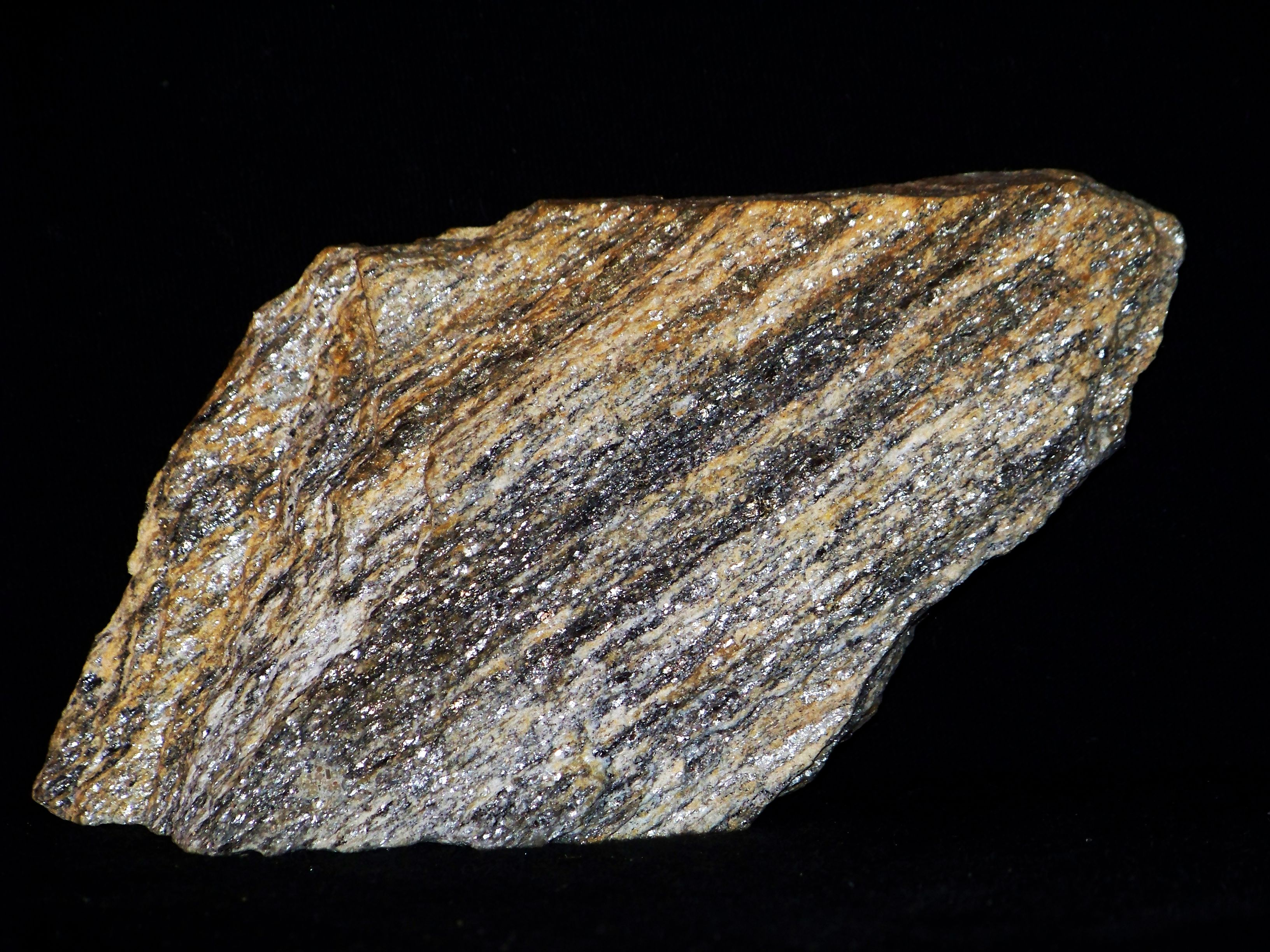
Mylonite, Owl Mountains, Poland

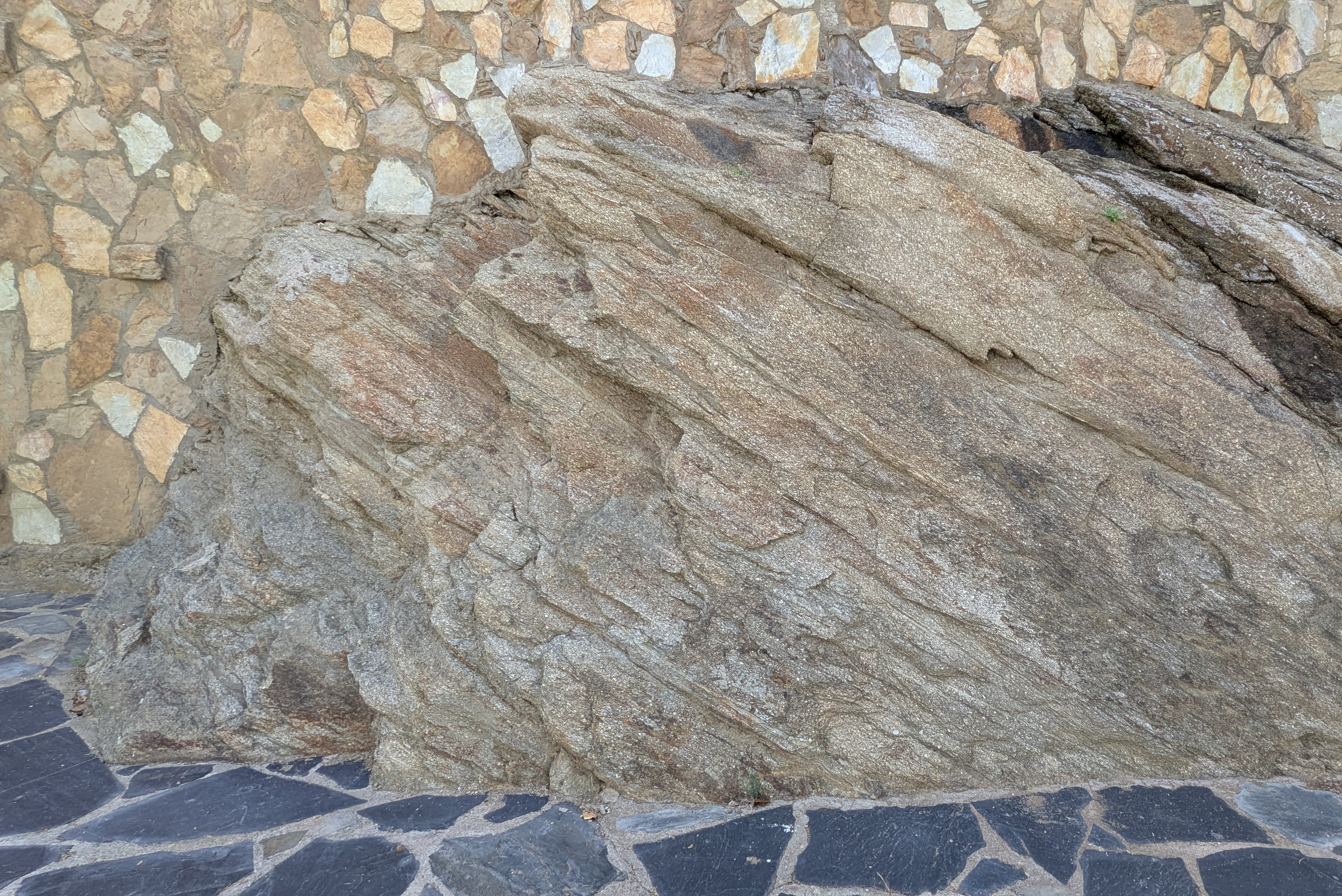
Roadside exposure of mylonite in Roses, Catalonia. The mylonite here is located in an area of shear zones running across Variscan granodiorite in the southern part of the Cap de Creus peninsula.

Mylonite is a fine-grained, compact metamorphic rock produced by dynamic recrystallization of the constituent minerals resulting in a reduction of the grain size of the rock. Mylonites can have many different mineralogical compositions; it is a classification based on the textural appearance of the rock.

== Formation ==
Mylonites are ductilely deformed rocks formed by the accumulation of large shear strain, in ductile fault zones. There are many different views on the formation of mylonites, but it is generally agreed that crystal-plastic deformation must have occurred, and that fracturing and cataclastic flow are secondary processes in the formation of mylonites. Mechanical abrasion of grains by milling does not occur, although this was originally thought to be the process that formed mylonites, which were named from the Greek μύλος mylos, meaning mill. Mylonites form at depths of no less than 4 km.

There are many different mechanisms that accommodate crystal-plastic deformation. In crustal rocks the most important processes are dislocation creep and diffusion creep. Dislocation generation acts to increase the internal energy of crystals. This effect is compensated through grain-boundary-migration recrystallization which reduces the internal energy by increasing the grain boundary area and reducing the grain volume, storing energy at the mineral grain surface. This process tends to organize dislocations into subgrain boundaries. As more dislocations are added to subgrain boundaries, the misorientation across that subgrain boundary will increase until the boundary becomes a high-angle boundary and the subgrain effectively becomes a new grain. This process, sometimes referred to as subgrain rotation recrystallization, acts to reduce the mean grain size. Volume and grain-boundary diffusion, the critical mechanisms in diffusion creep, become important at high temperatures and small grain sizes. Thus some researchers have argued that as mylonites are formed by dislocation creep and dynamic recrystallization, a transition to diffusion creep can occur once the grain size is reduced sufficiently.

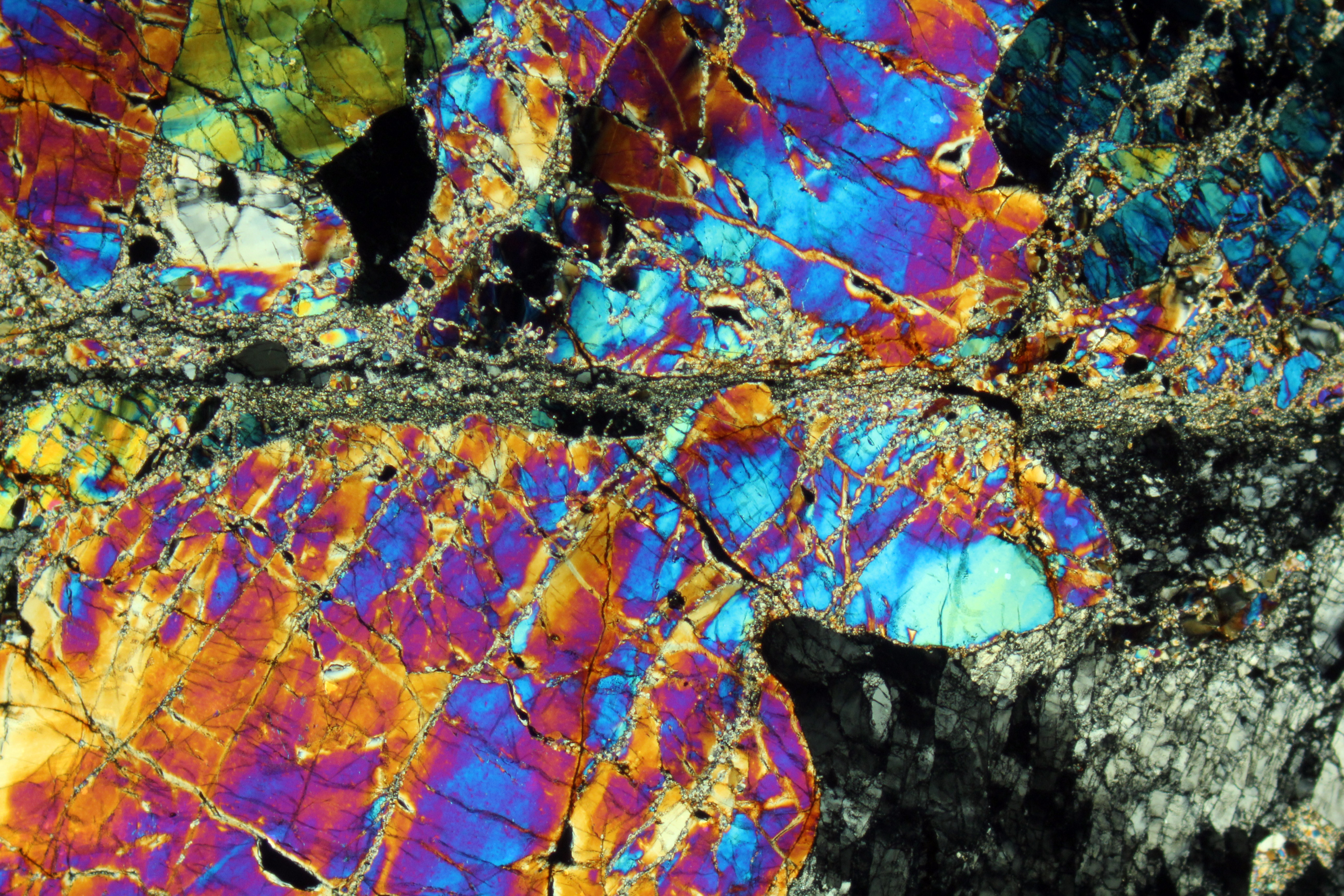
Peridotitic mylonite in a petrographic microscope

Mylonites generally develop in ductile shear zones where high rates of strain are focused. They are the deep crustal counterparts to cataclastic brittle faults that create fault breccias.

== Classification ==
- Blastomylonites are coarse grained, often sugary in appearance without distinct tectonic banding.
- Ultramylonites usually have undergone extreme grainsize reduction. In structural geology, ultramylonite is a kind of mylonite defined by modal percentage of matrix grains more than 90%. Ultramylonite is often hard, dark, cherty to flinty in appearance and sometimes resemble pseudotachylite and obsidian. In reverse, ultramylonite-like rocks are sometimes "deformed pseudotachylyte".
- Mesomylonites have undergone an appreciable amount of grainsize reduction, and are defined by their modal percentage of matrix grains being between 50 and 90%.
- Protomylonites are mylonites which have experienced limited grainsize reduction, and are defined by their modal percentage of matrix grains being less than 50%. Because mylonitisation is incomplete in these rocks, relict grains and textures are apparent, and some protomylonites can resemble foliated cataclasite or even some schists.
- Phyllonites are phyllosilicate (e.g., chlorite or mica)-rich mylonites. They typically have a well-developed secondary shear (C') fabric.

== Interpretation ==
Determining the displacements that occur in mylonite zones depends on correctly determining the orientations of the finite strain axis and inferring how those orientations change with respect to the incremental strain axis. This is referred to as determining the shear sense. It is common practice to assume that the deformation is plane strain simple shear deformation. This type of strain field assumes that deformation occurs in a tabular zone where displacement is parallel to the shear zone boundary. Furthermore, during deformation the incremental strain axis maintains a 45-degree angle to the shear zone boundary. The finite strain axes are initially parallel to the incremental axis, but rotate away during progressive deformation.

Kinematic indicators are structures in mylonites that allow the sense of shear to be determined. Most kinematic indicators are based on deformation in simple shear and infer sense of rotation of the finite strain axes with respect to the incremental strain axes. Because of the constraints imposed by simple shear, displacement is assumed to occur in the foliation plane in a direction parallel to the mineral stretching lineation. Therefore, a plane parallel to the lineation and perpendicular to the foliation is viewed to determine the shear sense.

The most common shear sense indicators are C/S fabrics, asymmetric porphyroclasts, vein and dike arrays, mantled porphyroclasts and mineral fibers. All of these indicators have a monoclinic symmetry which is directly related to the orientations of the finite strain axes. Although structures like asymmetric folds and boudinages are also related to the orientations of the finite strain axes, these structures can form from distinct strain paths and are not reliable kinematic indicators.
