= Oblique foliation =

Physical attribute in geology

In geology oblique foliation, steady state foliation or oblique fabric is a special type of a tectonically produced foliation or fabric, most commonly in quartz-rich layers. The microtectonic structure can be used to determine the shear sense in shear zones and their associated rocks, usually mylonites.

== Description of the structure ==
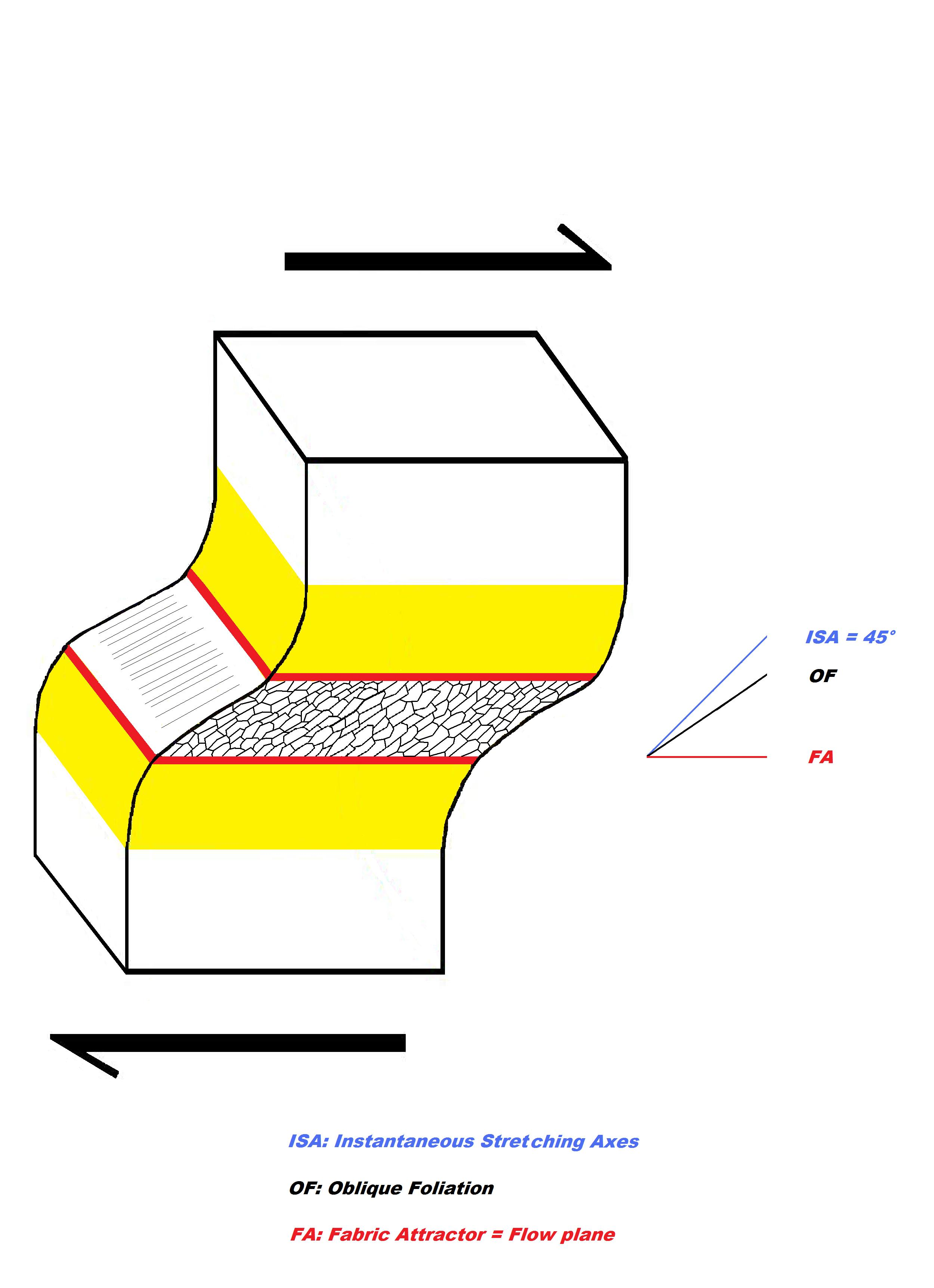
Diagram showing a quartz-rich layer in a dextral shear zone developing an oblique foliation. The geometrical relationships of the fabric elements are indicated.

Oblique foliation is mainly encountered in shear zones, where it forms as a result of the shearing deformations within the affected zone. As the name implies, this foliation/fabric takes on an oblique attitude to the shear-zone boundary (i.e. the fabric attractor) and internal layering, usually an angle of about 20°–40°, or less. (In some shear zones, even angles less than 5° are reported, yet angles steeper than 45° are also known). A closer look reveals that the foliation/fabric is created by the parallel arrangement of a multitude of similar oriented small grains, which are slightly elongated in the foliation direction. Oblique foliation thus represents primarily a shape-preferred orientation (SPO).

In their geometrical arrangement, oblique foliations are somewhat similar to (type I) S-C-fabric, in which the elongated grain fabric becomes a true schistosity/foliation. Occasionally mica fish get incorporated into oblique foliations; this structure has been called type II S-C-fabric by Lister & Snoke (1984).

== Formation of the structure ==
Oblique foliation is a fabric that has achieved a steady state, but does not represent the total accumulated strain.

The structure is thought to result from the interplay of passive flattening and rotation of grains in a non-coaxial flow field on one hand and grain boundary migration destroying the developing shape fabric at the same time on the other hand. The shearing deformation therefore is responsible for aligning the grains with the maximum extension direction of the incremental strain ellipsoid (the instantaneous stretching axes or ISA), whereas the process of dynamic recrystallisation opposes this by forming new equidimensional grains free of strain (by grain boundary migration); in order to achieve strain-free grains, a part of the developing shape fabric simultaneously must be destroyed.

Hence, during progressive deformation, the foliation remains relatively stationary in orientation with respect to the kinematic frame of reference. Another consequence is that the orientations of an oblique foliation generally lag behind the attitude of the total strain ellipsoid. The foliation never reaches the attitude of the flow plane and therefore only represents a part of the entire deformation history.

== Occurrence ==
Oblique foliation has been found mainly in mono-mineral rocks, but can also occur in poly-mineral rocks. The structure occurs in the entire metamorphic range from low-grade to high-grade rocks. Major occurrences are mono-mineral layers of quartz, muscovite, and calcite in layered mylonites. The structure has been described for quartz in quartzites, for calcite in carbonates and for olivine in peridotites. Oblique foliation is also known to occur in rock analogues like ice and synthetic octachloropropane.

== Theoretical considerations ==
The angle of the oblique foliation with the fabric attractor can be considered theoretically as a function of:

- the dynamic vorticity (number) W_{k}.
- the strain rate dγ/dt.
- the recrystallisation rate (and therefore indirectly also the ambient temperature T).

By measuring the angle of the oblique foliation, attempts have been made to determine W_{k}. Yet this method is problematic, because it neglects all the other parameters at work. Oblique foliations, whose angle with the fabric attractor exceeds 45°, pose a different problem difficult to reconcile with the available theory. One possible explanation for this seemingly paradoxical arrangement may be found in transtensional shear zones transposing the ordinary oblique foliation into steeper attitudes by simultaneous extension.

== Importance ==
Oblique foliations/fabrics find their most important use as shear sense indicators in mylonitic shear zones. The foliation/grain elongation always leans into the direction of shear, i.e. in a dextral shear zone, the foliation leans to the right and therefore dips to the left, and vice versa for sinistral shear. Combined with other shear sense indicators such as δ-objects, oblique foliations establish the movement sense quite clearly.

== Sources ==
- Passchier CW & Trouw RAJ. (1996). Microtectonics. Springer Verlag. ISBN 3-540-58713-6
- Trouw RAJ, Passchier CW & Wiersma DJ. (2010). Atlas of Mylonites – and related Microstructures. Springer Verlag.
- Vernon RH. (2004). A practical guide to rock microstructure. Cambridge University Press. ISBN 0-521-89133-7
