= Orientation =

Orientation may refer to:

== Positioning in physical space ==
- Map orientation, the relationship between directions on a map and compass directions
- Orientation (housing), the position of a building with respect to the sun, a concept in building design
- Orientation of churches, the architectural feature of facing ("orienting"), churches towards the east (Latin: oriens)
- Coin orientation, a description of the orientation of opposite faces of a coin with respect to one another
- Page orientation, the way in which a rectangular page is oriented for normal viewing
- In Animal navigation, turning the body to a desired heading, e.g. in the correct direction of migration
- Orientation (sign language), the orientation of the hands when signing
- Terms of orientation, language used to indicate the orientation of objects

== Arts and media ==
- Orientation (EP), a 2001 album by Sonata Arctica
- Orientation (film), a 1996 short film produced by the Church of Scientology
- "Orientation" (Lost), a 2005 episode of American television series Lost
- "Orientación", an episode of the American television series Prison Break
- "Orientation" (Heroes), a 2009 episode of American television series Heroes
- Orientation (Agents of S.H.I.E.L.D.), an episode of the American television series Agents of S.H.I.E.L.D.

== Mathematics ==
- Orientation (geometry), the direction in which a geometrical object is pointed
- Orientation (space), the choice, in a space, between "clockwise" and "counterclockwise"
  - Orientation (vector space), the specific case of linear algebra
  - Orientability, a property of a geometrical space which allows choosing an orientation, that is, distinguishing an object in the space from its mirror image
- Orientation (graph theory), an assignment of a direction (orientation) to each edge of an undirected graph

== Other uses ==
- Orientation (mental), a function of the mind
- Romantic orientation, the sex or gender with which a person is most likely to have a romantic relationship or fall in love
- Sexual orientation, the direction of an individual's sexuality with respect to the sex of the persons the individual finds sexually attractive
- Student orientation, the first week of a university year in several countries
- An aspect of the initial or "forming" stages of group development

== See also ==
- Oriented (film), a 2015 documentary film
- Orientation tensor, a tool in geology/earth sciences
- Orienteering, a sport involving map orientation
- Orientation and Mobility
