= Crenulation =

Geological fabric formed in metamorphic rocks

In a geological context, crenulation or crenulation cleavage is a fabric formed in metamorphic rocks such as phyllite, schist and some gneiss by two or more stress directions causing the formation of the superimposed foliations.

== Formation ==
Crenulations form when an early planar fabric is overprinted by a later planar fabric. Crenulations form by recrystallisation of mica minerals during metamorphism. Micaceous minerals form planar surfaces known as foliations perpendicular to the principal stress fields. If a rock is subjected to two separate deformations and the second deformation is at some other angle to the original, growth of new micas on the foliation planes will create a new foliation plane perpendicular to the plane of principal stress. The angular intersection of the two foliations causes a diagnostic texture called a crenulation, which may involve folding of the earlier mica foliations by the later foliation.

== Recognition ==
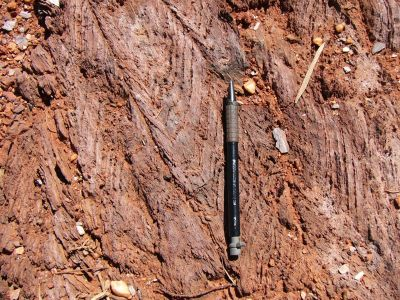
Example of a large-scale crenulation forming kink-folds, Nathans Mine, Glengarry Basin, W.A., showing the superposition of F5 foliation on earlier F3-F4 foliation. A mechanical pencil is seen for scale comparison.

Recognising a crenulation in a rock may require inspecting the rock with a hand-lens or petrographic microscope in thin section. Crenulations may be very cryptic, and there may be several recorded within a rock and especially, entrained within porphyroblasts.

Crenulations may manifest as kinking of previous foliation, such that the original foliation appears to be lined or inscribed by a later foliation.

In more advanced states, the later foliation will tend to form distinct foliation planes cross-cutting the earlier foliation, resulting in breaking, warping, and micro-scale folding of the earlier foliation into the new foliation.

When the crenulation foliation begins to dominate it may totally or almost completely wipe out the original foliation. This process occurs at different rates in rocks and beds of different lithology and chemical composition so that it is usually valuable to look at a variety of outcrops to gain a better appreciation of the effect of crenulation or discover the orientation or presence of earlier foliations.

Crenulation may also be the incipient foliation plane which precipitates shearing. In this case, it is often likely that the crenulation acts as a shear plane and it may be difficult to reconstruct earlier foliations and rock units across the crenulation foliation.

== Analysis ==
Crenulations, because they are the result of a second (or more) foliation, preserve important information on not only the stresses which formed the crenulation foliation, but the orientation of previous foliations. Firstly, the crenulation must be analysed to determine the initial foliation, termed S_{1}, and the overprinting subsequent foliation. The intersection of these two planes forms an intersection lineation. This intersection lineation, L_{1-2} may approximate the plunge of F2 interference folds.

The initial impact of a crenulation foliation may be cryptic, microscopic growth of new minerals at an angle to previous foliations. This may occur only in certain compositions of the rocks which favor growth of minerals under the P-T conditions at that time.

In more brittle conditions, especially in highly micaceous rocks, a crenulation may appear as 'kink bands, where S1 foliations are kinked by the S2 foliation so that the original minerals are broken or deformed. This may not result in new mineral growth.

Eventually, the crenulation foliation overprints the S1 foliation. In extreme cases, the S2 foliation will obliterate the previous foliation, especially in wet rocks which have compositions amenable to growth of minerals at that time. In this case, porphyroblasts may be the only means in which to observe earlier foliations, assuming they have inclusion trails of the S1 foliation.

== See also ==
- List of rock textures
- Metamorphism
- Rock microstructure
- Structural geology
- Shear (geology)
