= Shear (geology) =

Response of rock to deformation

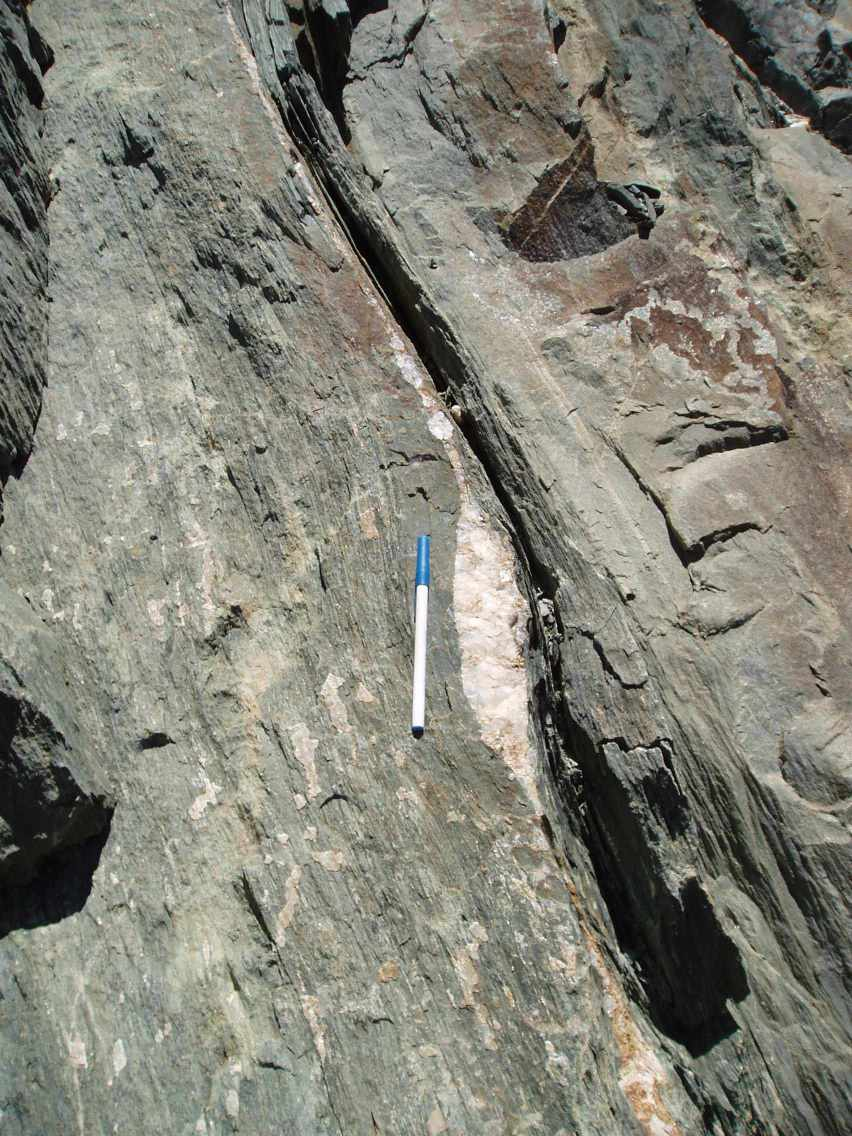
Boudinaged quartz vein (with strain fringe) showing sinistral shear sense, Starlight Pit, Fortnum Gold Mine, Western Australia

In geology, shear is the response of a rock to deformation usually by compressive stress and forms particular textures. Shear can be homogeneous or non-homogeneous, and may be pure shear or simple shear. Study of geological shear is related to the study of structural geology, rock microstructure or rock texture and fault mechanics.

The process of shearing occurs within brittle, brittle-ductile, and ductile rocks. Within purely brittle rocks, compressive stress results in fracturing and simple faulting.

== Rocks ==
Rocks typical of shear zones include mylonite, cataclasite, S-tectonite and L-tectonite, pseudotachylite, certain breccias and highly foliated versions of the wall rocks.

== Shear zone ==
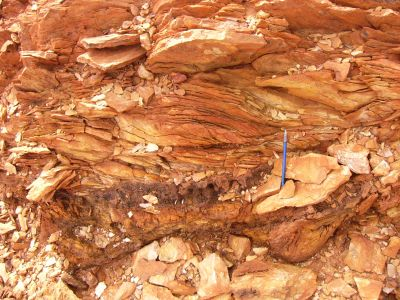
Asymmetric shear in basalt, Labouchere mine, Glengarry Basin, Australia. Shear asymmetry is sinistral, pen for scale

A shear zone is a tabular to sheetlike, planar or curviplanar zone composed of rocks that are more highly strained than rocks adjacent to the zone. Typically this is a type of fault, but it may be difficult to place a distinct fault plane into the shear zone. Shear zones may form zones of much more intense foliation, deformation, and folding. En echelon veins or fractures may be observed within shear zones.

Many shear zones host ore deposits as they are a focus for hydrothermal flow through orogenic belts. They may often show some form of retrograde metamorphism from a peak metamorphic assemblage and are commonly metasomatised.

Shear zones can be only inches wide, or up to several kilometres wide. Often, due to their structural control and presence at the edges of tectonic blocks, shear zones are mappable units and form important discontinuities to separate terranes. As such, many large and long shear zones are named, identical to fault systems.

When the horizontal displacement of this faulting can be measured in the tens or hundreds of kilometers of length, the fault is referred to as a megashear. Megashears often indicate the edges of ancient tectonic plates.

== Mechanisms of shearing ==
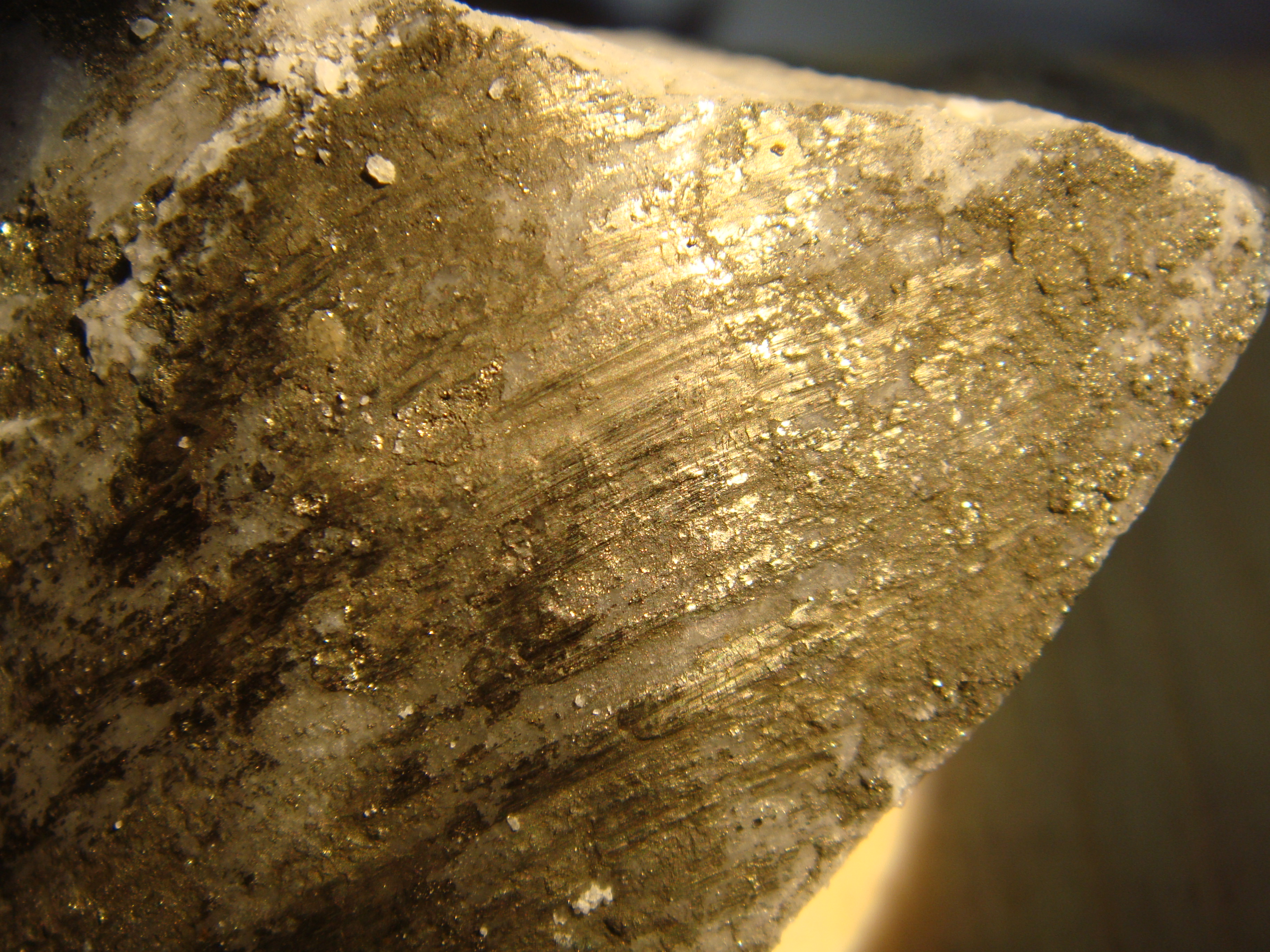
Dextral slickenside of pyrite

The mechanisms of shearing depend on the pressure and temperature of the rock and on the rate of shear which the rock is subjected to. The response of the rock to these conditions determines how it accommodates the deformation.

Shear zones which occur in more brittle rheological conditions (cooler, less confining pressure) or at high rates of strain, tend to fail by brittle failure; breaking of minerals, which are ground up into a breccia with a milled texture.

Shear zones which occur under brittle-ductile conditions can accommodate much deformation by enacting a series of mechanisms which rely less on fracture of the rock and occur within the minerals and the mineral lattices themselves. Shear zones accommodate compressive stress by movement on foliation planes.

Shearing at ductile conditions may occur by fracturing of minerals and growth of sub-grain boundaries, as well as by lattice glide. This occurs particularly on platy minerals, especially micas.

Mylonites are essentially ductile shear zones.

== Microstructures of shear zones ==
Typical example of dextral shear foliation in an L-S tectonite, with pencil pointing in direction of shear sense. Note the sinusoidal nature of the shear foliation.

During the initiation of shearing, a penetrative planar foliation is first formed within the rock mass. This manifests as realignment of textural features, growth and realignment of micas and growth of new minerals.

The incipient shear foliation typically forms normal to the direction of principal shortening, and is diagnostic of the direction of shortening. In symmetric shortening, objects flatten on this shear foliation much the same way that a round ball of treacle flattens with gravity.

Within asymmetric shear zones, the behavior of an object undergoing shortening is analogous to the ball of treacle being smeared as it flattens, generally into an ellipse. Within shear zones with pronounced displacements a shear foliation may form at a shallow angle to the gross plane of the shear zone. This foliation ideally manifests as a sinusoidal set of foliations formed at a shallow angle to the main shear foliation, and which curve into the main shear foliation. Such rocks are known as L-S tectonites.

If the rock mass begins to undergo large degrees of lateral movement, the strain ellipse lengthens into a cigar shaped volume. At this point shear foliations begin to break down into a rodding lineation or a stretch lineation. Such rocks are known as L-tectonites.

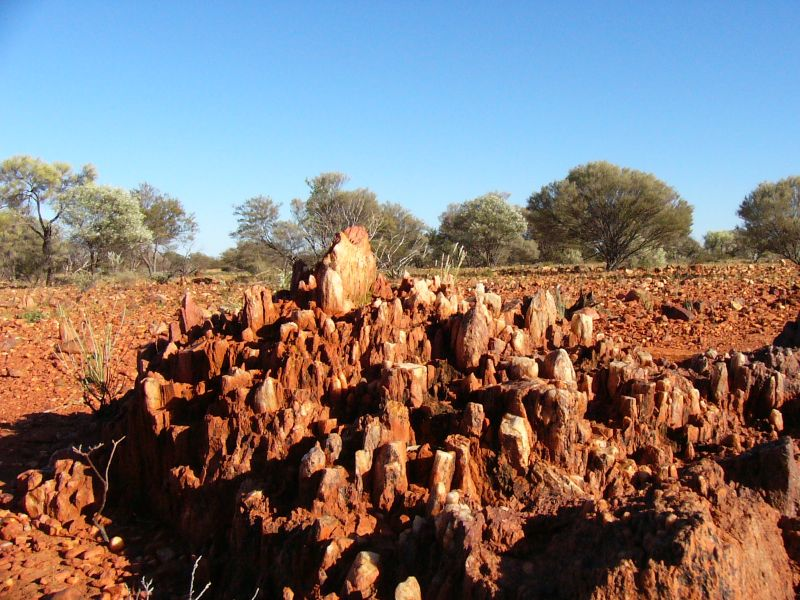
Stretched pebble conglomerate L-tectonite illustrating a stretch lineation within a shear zone, Glengarry Basin, Australia. Pronounced asymmetric shearing has stretched the conglomerate pebbles into elongate cigar shaped rods.

== Ductile shear microstructures ==
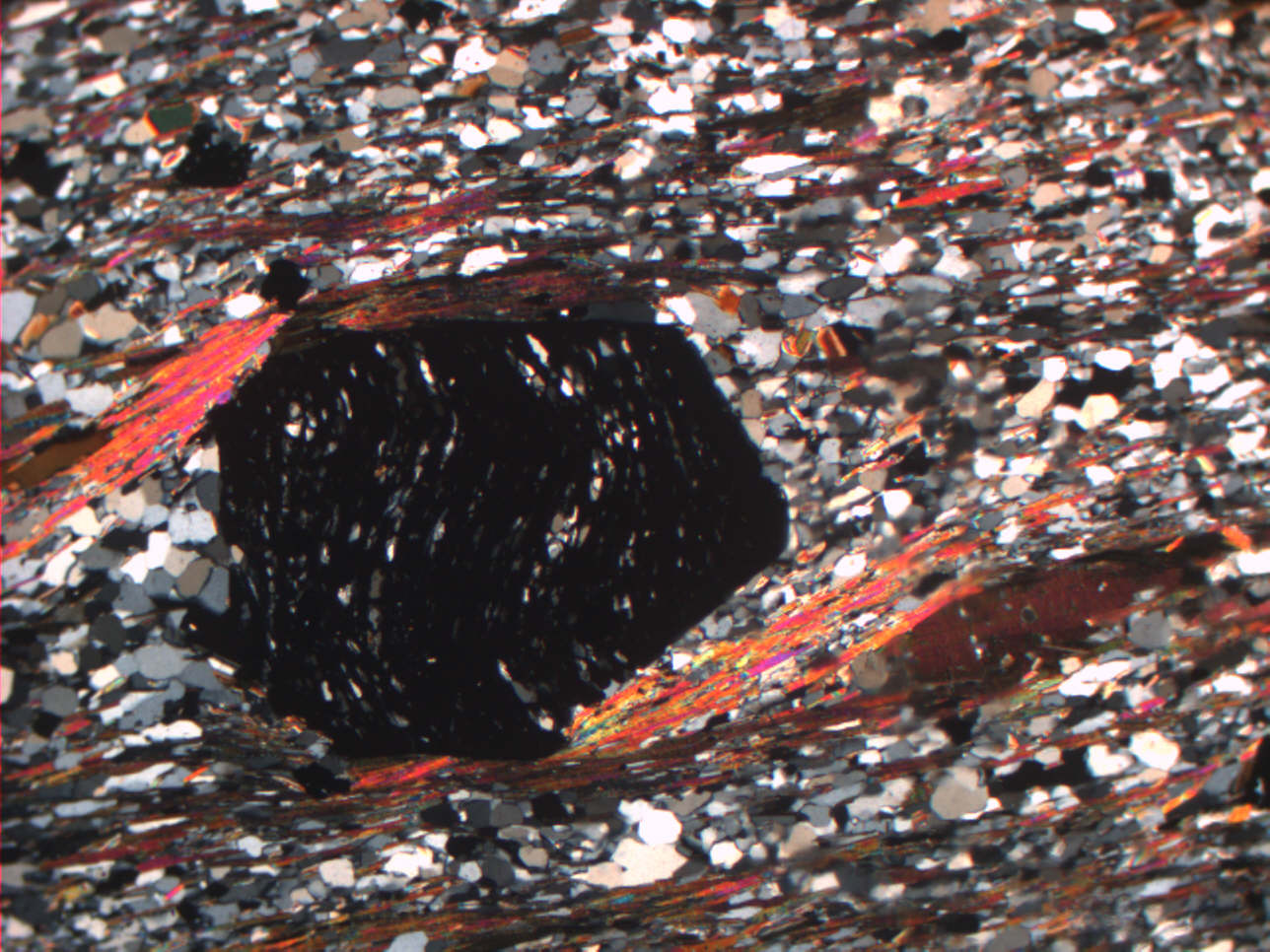
Thin section (crossed polars) of Garnet-Mica-Schist showing a rotated porphyroblast of garnet, mica fish and elongated minerals. This specimen was from close to a shear zone in Norway (the Ose thrust), the garnet in the centre (black) is approximately 2mm in diameter

Very distinctive textures form as a consequence of ductile shear. An important group of microstructures observed in ductile shear zones are S-planes, C-planes and C' planes.

- S-planes or schistosité planes are generally defined by a planar fabric caused by the alignment of micas or platy minerals. Define the flattened long-axis of the strain ellipse.
- C-planes or cisaillement planes form parallel to the shear zone boundary. The angle between the C and S planes is always acute, and defines the shear sense. Generally, the lower the C-S angle the greater the strain.
- The C' planes, also known as shear bands and secondary shear fabrics, are commonly observed in strongly foliated mylonites especially phyllonites, and form at an angle of about 20 degrees to the S-plane.

The sense of shear shown by both S-C and S-C' structures matches that of the shear zone in which they are found.

Other microstructures which can give sense of shear include:

- sigmoidal veins
- mica fish
- rotated porphyroclasts
- asymmetric boudins (Figure 1)
- asymmetric folds

== Transpression ==
Transpression regimes are formed during oblique collision of tectonic plates and during non-orthogonal subduction. Typically a mixture of oblique-slip thrust faults and strike-slip or transform faults are formed. Microstructural evidence of transpressional regimes can be rodding lineations, mylonites, augen-structured gneisses, mica fish and so on.

A typical example of a transpression regime is the Alpine Fault zone of New Zealand, where the oblique subduction of the Pacific Plate under the Indo-Australian Plate is converted to oblique strike-slip movement. Here, the orogenic belt attains a trapezoidal shape dominated by oblique splay faults, steeply-dipping recumbent nappes and fault-bend folds.

The Alpine Schist of New Zealand is characterised by heavily crenulated and sheared phyllite. It is being pushed up at the rate of 8 to 10 mm per year, and the area is prone to large earthquakes with a south block up and west oblique sense of movement.

== Transtension ==
Transtension regimes are oblique tensional environments. Oblique, normal geologic fault and detachment faults in rift zones are the typical structural manifestations of transtension conditions. Microstructural evidence of transtension includes rodding or stretching lineations, stretched porphyroblasts, mylonites, etc.

== See also ==
- Convergent boundary
- Crenulation
- Fault (geology)
- Foliation (geology)
- Rock microstructure
- Strain partitioning
- Sense of shear indicators: dextral and sinistral
