= Milan Luković =

Serbian geologist (1889–1972)

Milan Luković (Kraljevo, Kingdom of Serbia, April 17, 1889 – Belgrade, Serbia, Yugoslavia, September 15, 1972) was a Serbian geologist and academic. He is best remembered as a stratigrapher, structural geologist and hydrogeologist.

He authored and co-author numerous scientific papers on geology, and lectured at congresses on the same subject.

Milan Luković was the chief editor of the Vesnik's 1940 Yearbook which contained annual reports of the director of the Serbian Geological Institute, reports of geologists on fieldwork and general geological information. From 1947 until 1953, he was the president of the Serbian Geological Society.
