= Shear zone =

Structural discontinuity surface in the Earth's crust and upper mantle

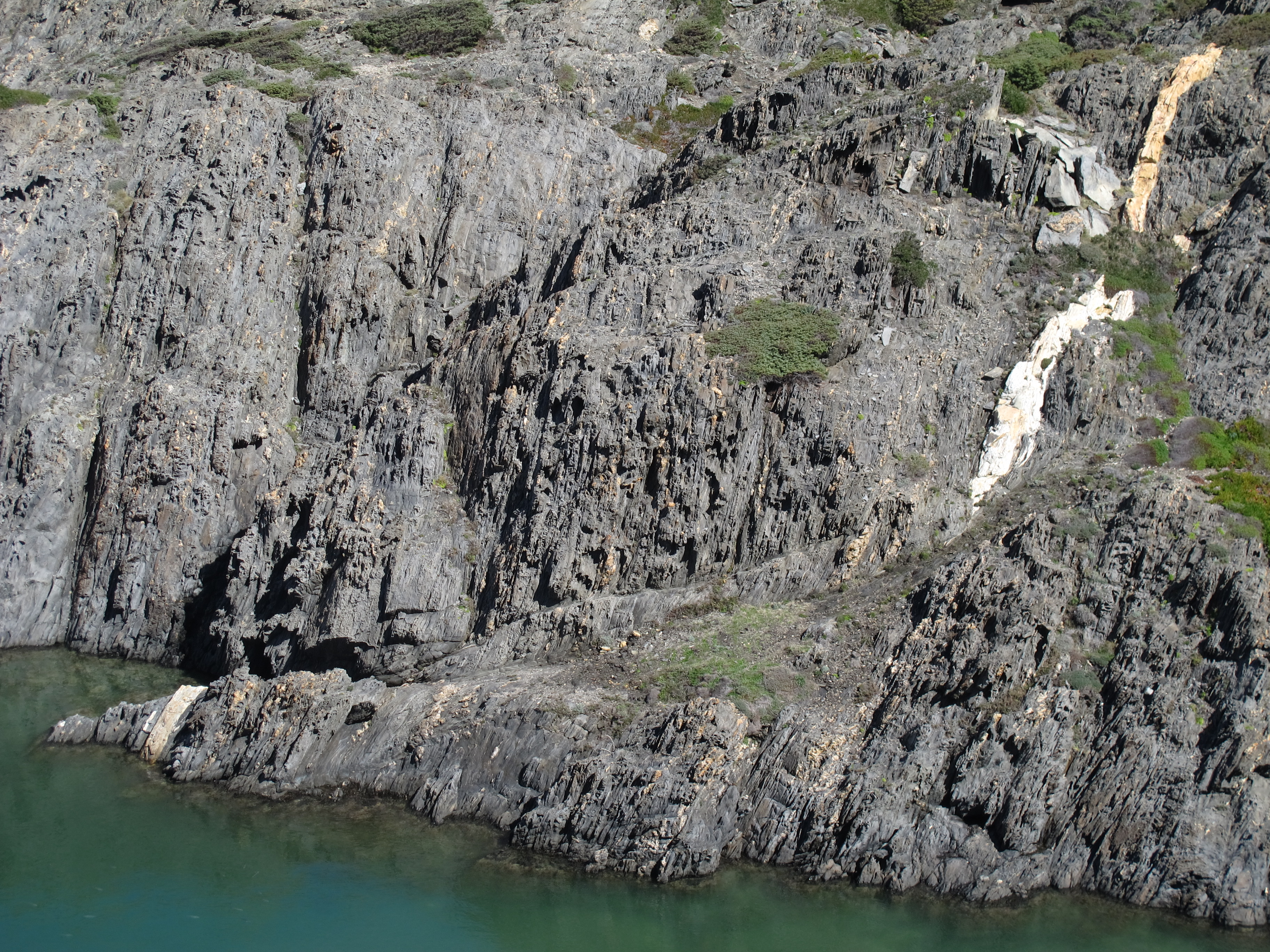
Pegmatite dyke offset by a steeply dipping dextral shear zone, Cap de Creus

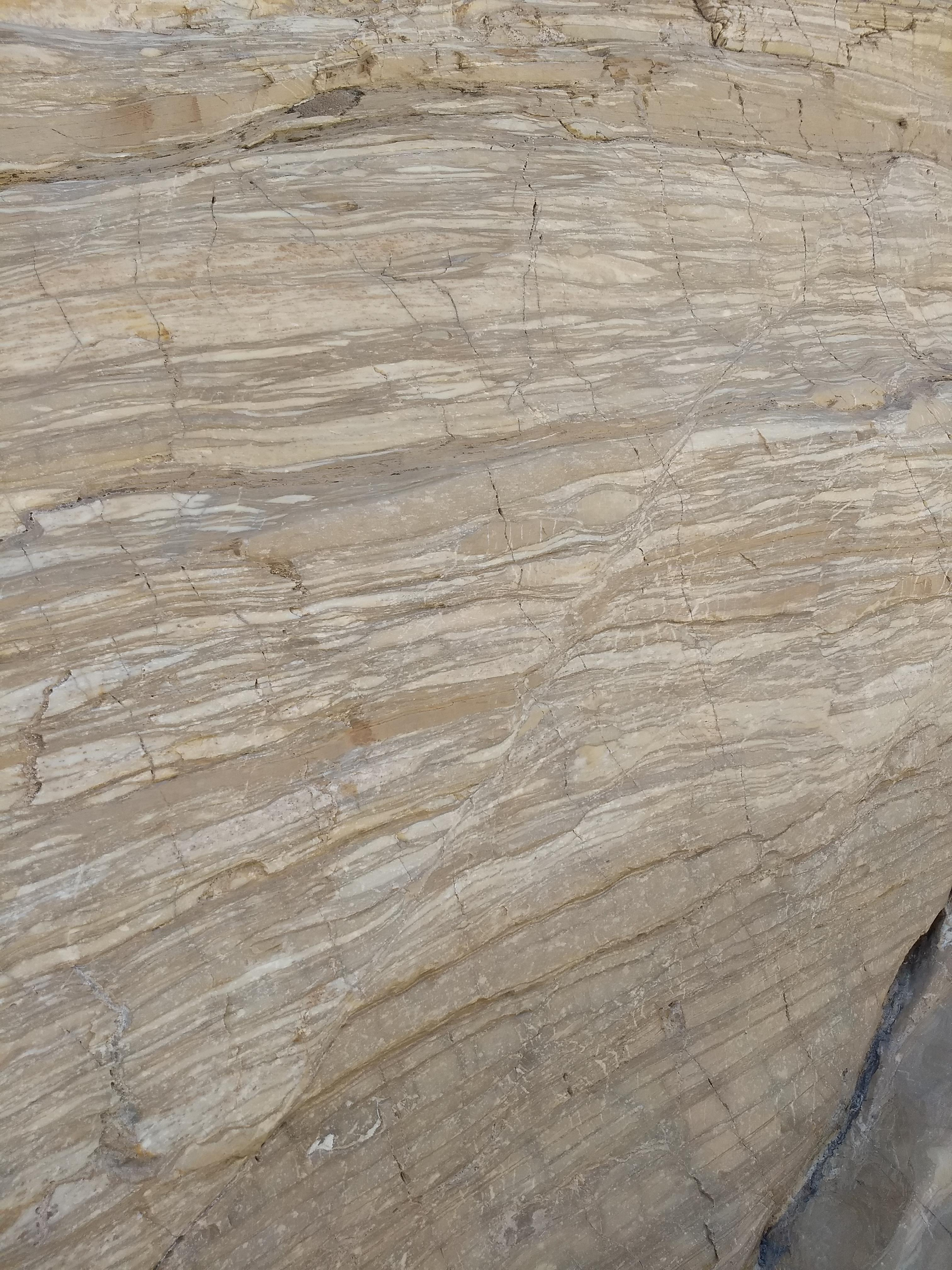
Extensional ductile shear zone cutting dolomites of the Noonday Formation in Mosaic Canyon, Death Valley

In geology, a shear zone is a thin zone within the Earth's crust or upper mantle that has been strongly deformed, due to the walls of rock on either side of the zone slipping past each other. In the upper crust, where rock is brittle, the shear zone takes the form of a fracture called a fault. In the lower crust and mantle, the extreme conditions of pressure and temperature make the rock ductile. That is, the rock is capable of slowly deforming without fracture, like hot metal being worked by a blacksmith. Here the shear zone is a wider zone, in which the ductile rock has slowly flowed to accommodate the relative motion of the rock walls on either side.

Because shear zones are found across a wide depth-range, a great variety of different rock types with their characteristic structures are associated with shear zones.

== General introduction ==
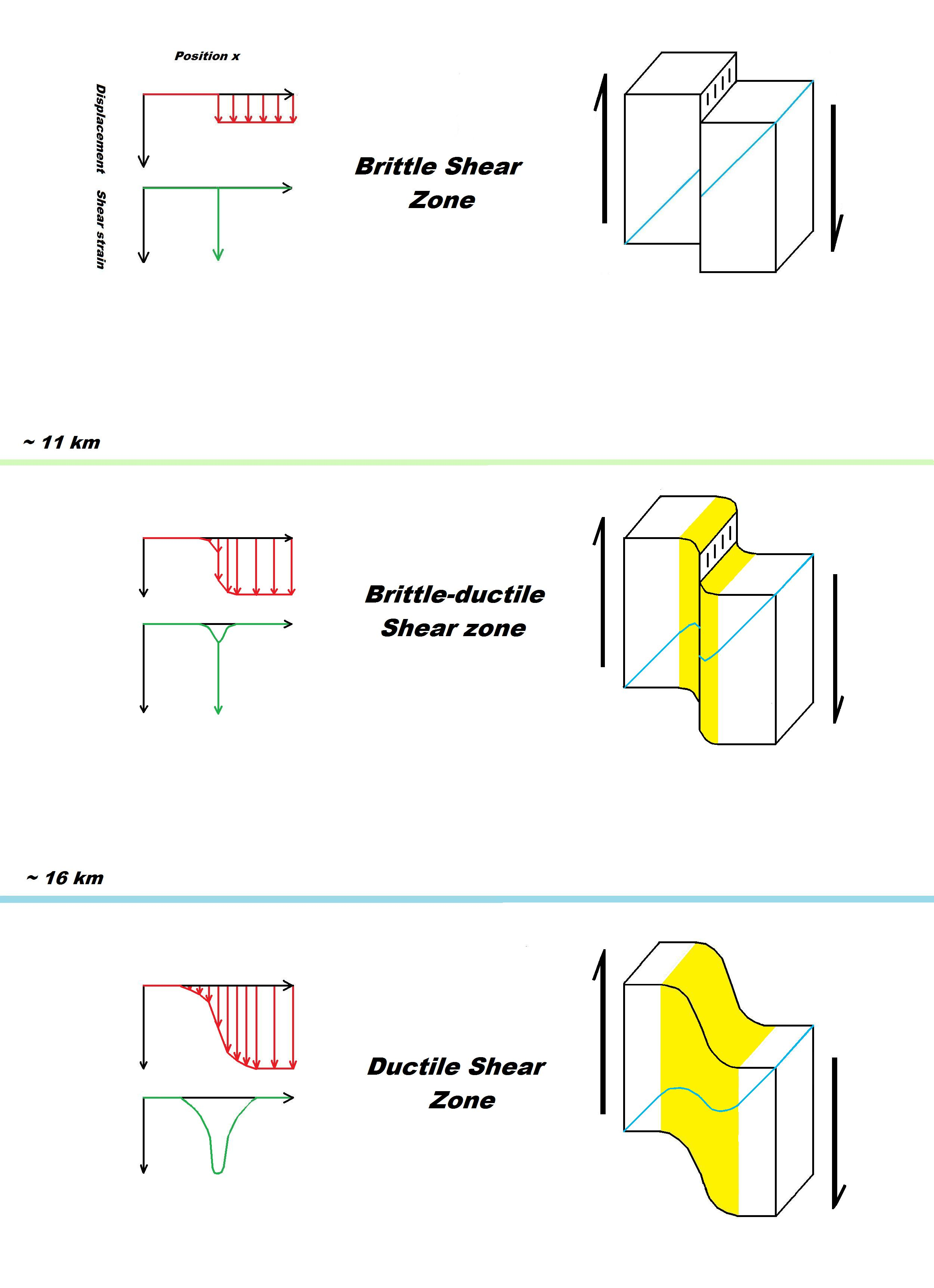
Diagram showing the major different types of shear zones. Displacement, shear strain, and depth distribution are also indicated.

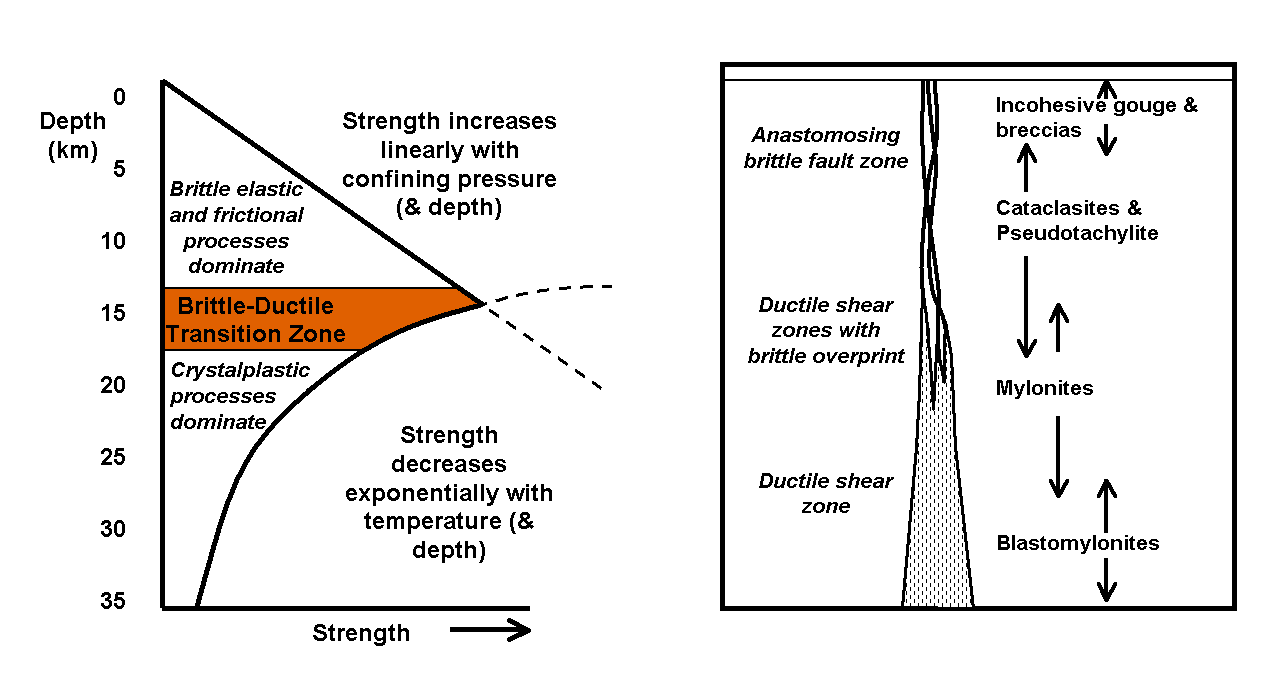
Strength profile and change in rock type with depth in idealised fault/shear zone

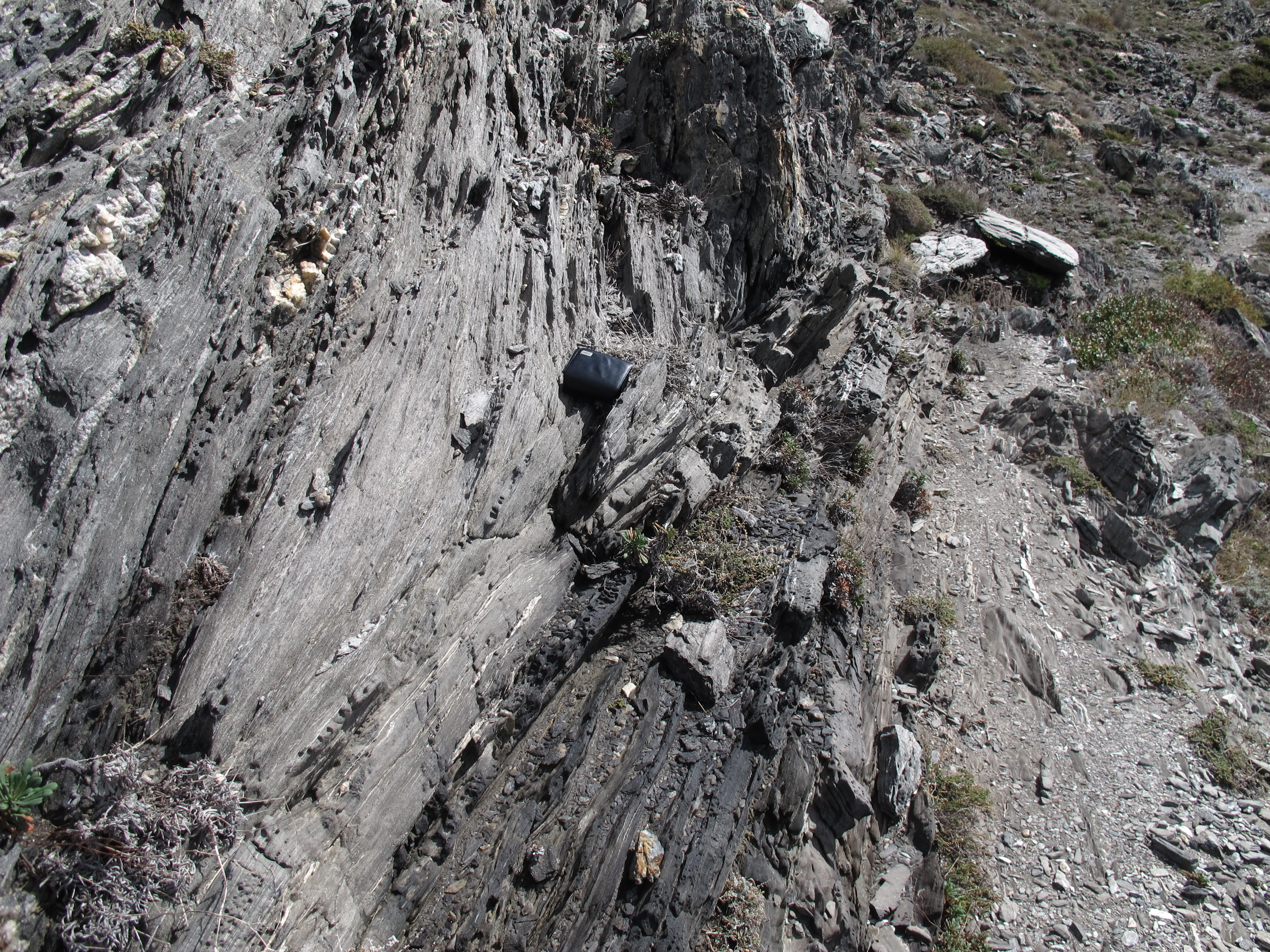
Margin of a dextral sense ductile shear zone (about 20 m thick), showing transition from schists outside the zone to mylonites inside, Cap de Creus,

A shear zone is a zone of strong deformation (with a high strain rate) surrounded by rocks with a lower state of finite strain. It is characterised by a length to width ratio of more than 5:1.

Shear zones form a continuum of geological structures, ranging from brittle shear zones (or faults) via brittle–ductile shear zones (or semibrittle shear zones), ductile–brittle to ductile shear zones. In brittle shear zones, the deformation is concentrated in a narrow fracture surface separating the wall rocks, whereas in a ductile shear zone the deformation is spread out through a wider zone, the deformation state varying continuously from wall to wall. Between these end-members, there are intermediate types of brittle–ductile (semibrittle) and ductile–brittle shear zones that can combine these geometric features in different proportions.

This continuum found in the structural geometries of shear zones reflects the different deformation mechanisms reigning in the crust, i.e. the changeover from brittle (fracturing) at or near the surface to ductile (flow) deformation with increasing depth. By passing through the brittle–semibrittle transition the ductile response to deformation is starting to set in. This transition is not tied to a specific depth, but rather occurs over a certain depth range - the so-called alternating zone, where brittle fracturing and plastic flow coexist. The main reason for this is found in the usually heteromineral composition of rocks, with different minerals showing different responses to applied stresses (for instance, under stress quartz reacts plastically long before feldspars do). Thus differences in lithology, grain size, and preexisting fabrics determine a different rheological response. Yet other, purely physical factors, influence the changeover depth as well, including:

- geothermal gradient, i.e. ambient temperature.
- confinement pressure and fluid pressure.
- bulk strain rate.
- stress field orientation.

In Scholz's model for a quartzo-feldspathic crust (with a geotherm taken from Southern California), the brittle–semibrittle transition starts at about 11 km depth with an ambient temperature of 300 °C. The underlying alternating zone then extends to roughly 16 km depth with a temperature of about 360 °C. Below approximately 16 km depth, only ductile shear zones are found.

The seismogenic zone, in which earthquakes nucleate, is tied to the brittle domain, the schizosphere. Below an intervening alternating zone, there is the plastosphere. In the seismogenic layer, which occurs below an upper stability transition related to an upper seismicity cutoff (situated usually at about 4–5 km depth), true cataclasites start to appear. The seismogenic layer then yields to the alternating zone at 11 km depth. Yet big earthquakes can rupture both up to the surface and well into the alternating zone, sometimes even into the plastosphere.

== Rocks produced in shear zones ==
The deformations in shear zones are responsible for the development of characteristic fabrics and mineral assemblages reflecting the reigning pressure–temperature (pT) conditions, flow type, movement sense, and deformation history. Shear zones are therefore very important structures for unravelling the history of a specific terrane.

Starting at the Earth's surface, the following rock types are usually encountered in a shear zone:

- uncohesive fault rocks. Examples being fault gouge, fault breccia, and foliated gouge.
- cohesive fault rocks like crush breccias and cataclasites (protocataclasite, cataclasite, and ultracataclasite).
- glassy pseudotachylites.

Both fault gouge and cataclasites are due to abrasive wear on brittle, seismogenic faults.

- foliated mylonites (phyllonites).
- striped gneiss.

Mylonites start to occur with the onset of semibrittle behaviour in the alternating zone characterised by adhesive wear. Pseudotachylites can still be encountered here. By passing into greenschist facies conditions, the pseudotachylites disappear and only different types of mylonites persist. Striped gneisses are high-grade mylonites and occur at the very bottom of ductile shear zones.

== Sense of shear ==
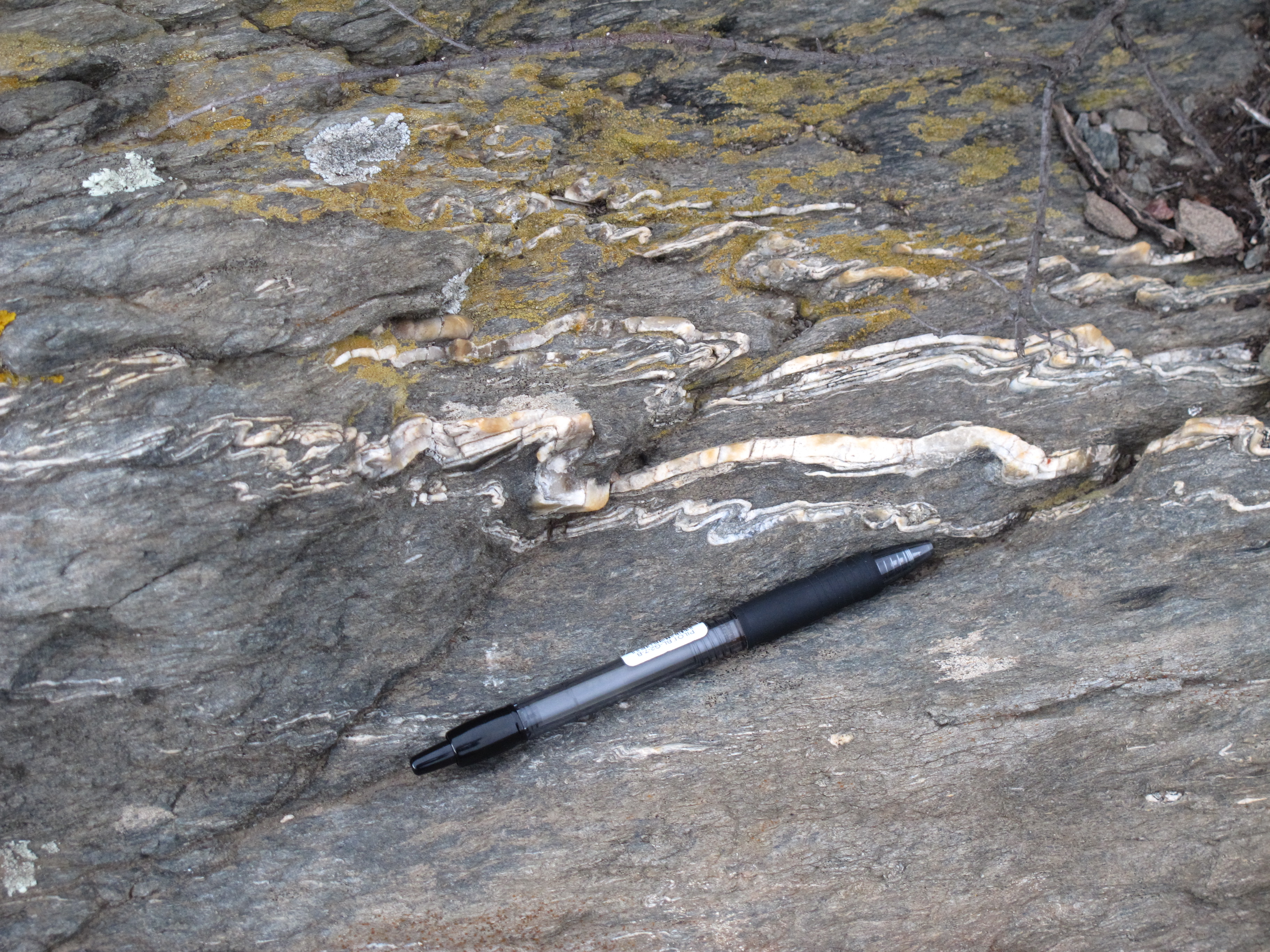
Asymmetric folds within a dextral sense shear zone, Cap de Creus

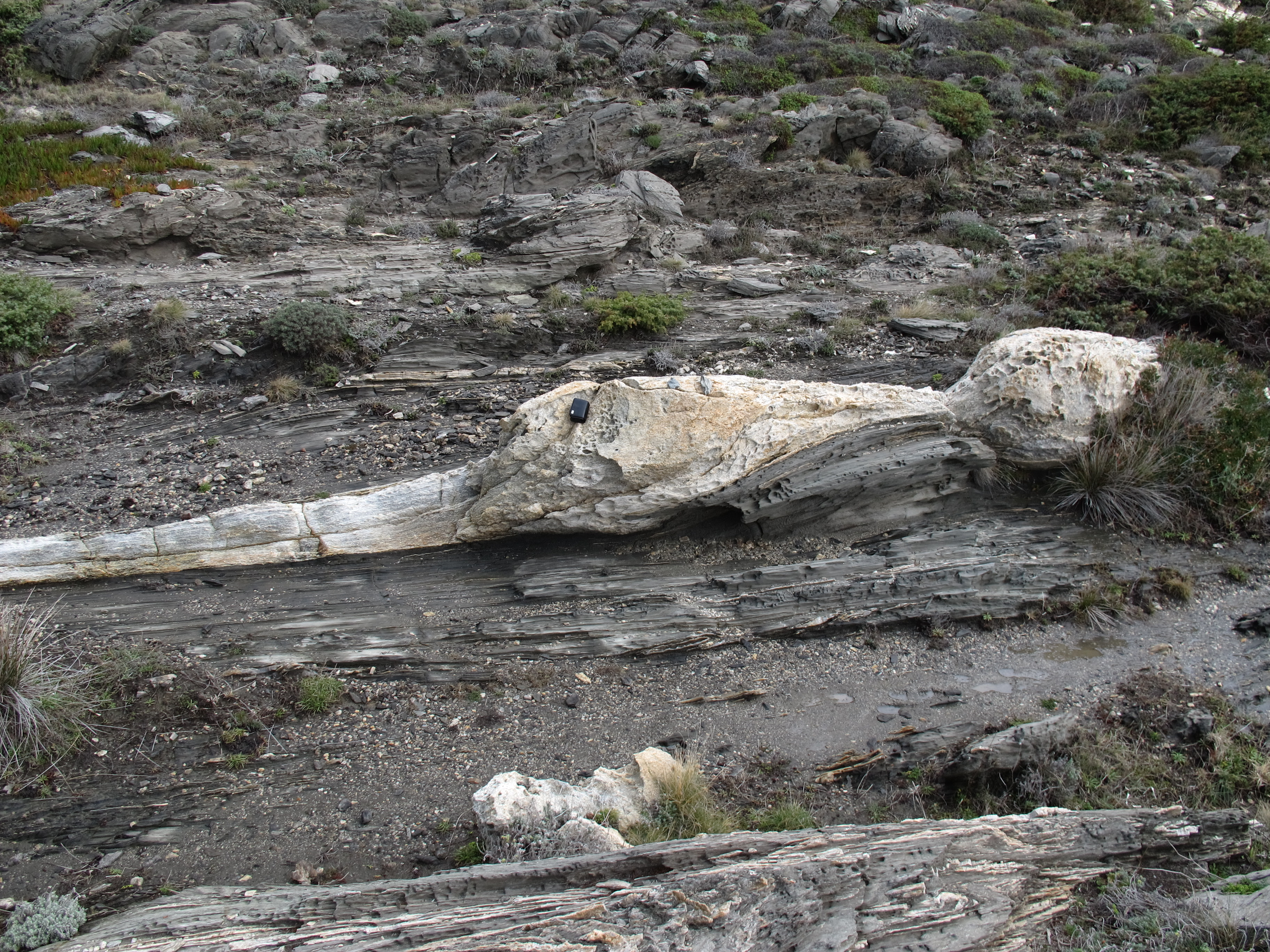
Asymmetric boudins of pegmatite within a dextral sense shear zone, Cap de Creus

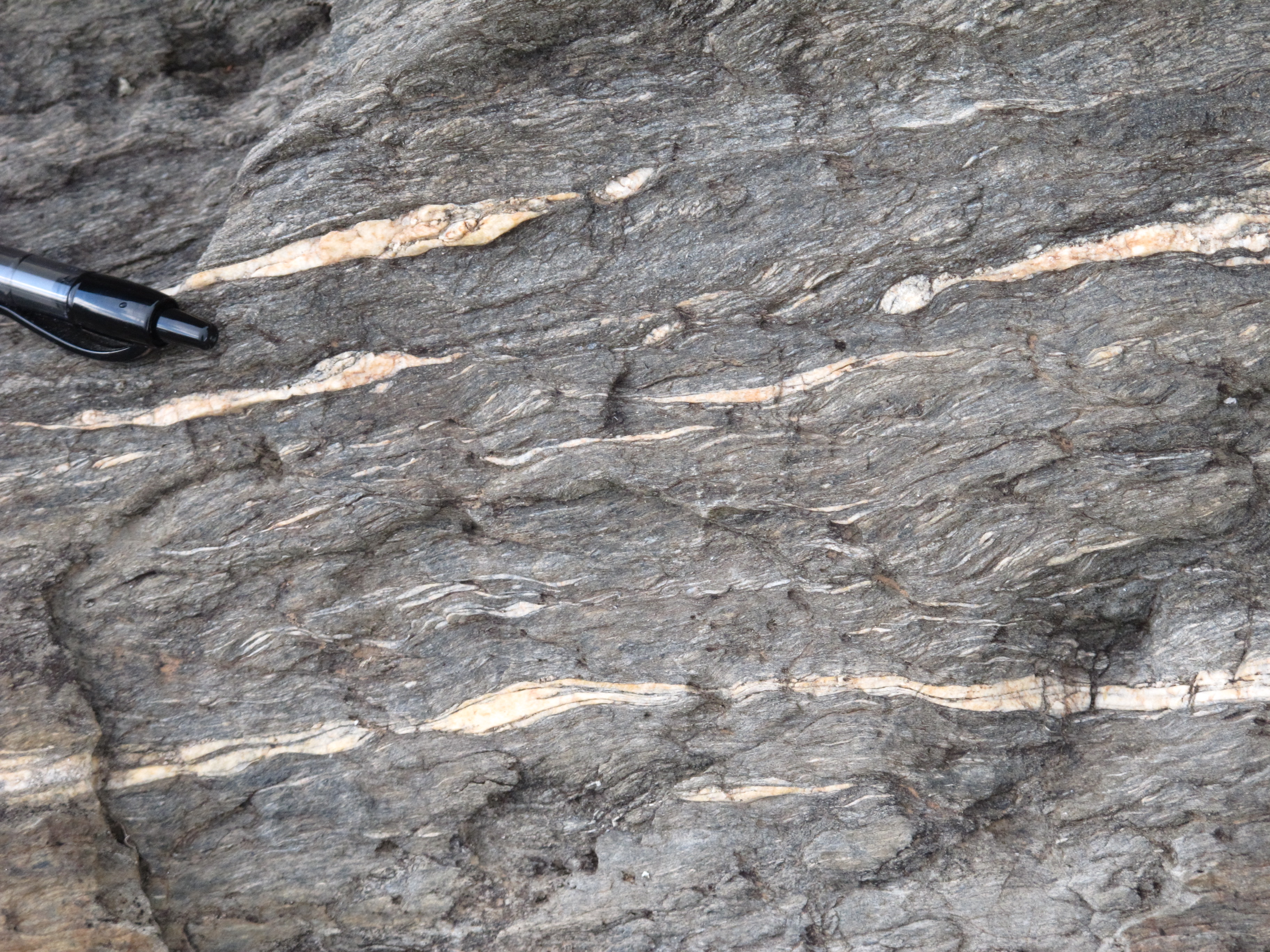
Shear bands developed in a dextral sense shear zone, Cap de Creus

The sense of shear in a shear zone (dextral, sinistral, reverse or normal) can be deduced by macroscopic structures and by a plethora of microtectonic indicators.

=== Indicators ===
The main macroscopic indicators are striations (slickensides), slickenfibers, and stretching– or mineral lineations. They indicate the direction of movement. With the aid of offset markers such as displaced layering and dykes, or the deflection (bending) of layering/foliation into a shear zone, one can additionally determine the sense of shear.

En echelon tension gash arrays (or extensional veins), characteristic of ductile-brittle shear zones, and sheath folds can also be valuable macroscopic shear-sense indicators.

Microscopic indicators consist of the following structures:

- asymmetric folds.
- foliations.
- imbrications.
- Crystallographic preferred orientation (CPO).
- mantled and winged porphyroclasts. Well-known examples are theta (Θ)-objects and phi (Φ)-porphyroclasts, as well as sigma (σ)- and delta (δ)-winged objects.
- mica fish (foliation fish).
- pressure shadows
- pull-aparts.
- quarter structures.
- shear band cleavages.
- step-over sites.

== Width of shear zones and resulting displacements ==
The width of individual shear zones stretches from the grain scale to the kilometer scale. Crustal-scale shear zones (megashears) can become 10 km wide and consequently show very large displacements from tens to hundreds of kilometers.

Brittle shear zones (faults) usually widen with depth and with an increase in displacements.

== Strain softening and ductility ==
Because shear zones are characterised by the localisation of strain, some form of strain softening must occur, in order for the affected host material to deform more plastically. The softening can be brought about by the following phenomena:

- grain-size reductions.
- geometric softening.
- reaction softening.
- fluid-related softening.

Furthermore, for a material to become more ductile (quasi-plastic) and undergo continuous deformation (flow) without fracturing, the following deformation mechanisms (on a grain scale) have to be taken into account:

- diffusion creep (various types).
- dislocation creep (various types).
- dynamic recrystallization
- pressure solution processes.
- grain-boundary sliding (superplasticity) and grain-boundary area reduction.

== Occurrence and examples of shear zones ==
Due to their deep penetration, shear zones are found in all metamorphic facies. Brittle shear zones are more or less ubiquitous in the upper crust. Ductile shear zones start at greenschist facies conditions and are therefore restricted to metamorphic terranes.

Shear zones can occur in the following geotectonic settings:

- transcurrent setting – steep to vertical:
  - strike-slip zones.
  - transform faults.
- compressive setting – low-angle
  - recumbent fold nappes (at the base of).
  - subduction zones.
  - thrust sheets (at the base of).
- extensional setting – low-angle
  - metamorphic core complex detachments.

Shear zones are dependent neither on rock type nor on geological age. Most often they are not isolated in their occurrence, but commonly form fractal-scaled, linked up, anastomosing networks which reflect in their arrangement the underlying dominant sense of movement of the terrane at that time.

Some good examples of shear zones of the strike-slip type are the South Armorican Shear Zone and the North Armorican Shear Zone in Brittany, the North Anatolian Fault Zone in Turkey, and the Dead Sea Fault in Israel. Shear zones of the transform type are the San Andreas Fault in California, and the Alpine Fault in New Zealand. A shear zone of the thrust type is the Moine Thrust in northwestern Scotland. An example for the subduction zone setting is the Japan Median Tectonic Line. Detachment fault related shear zones can be found in southeastern California, e.g. the Whipple Mountain Detachment Fault. An example of a huge anastomosing shear-zone is the Borborema Shear Zone in Brazil.

== Importance ==
The importance of shear zones lies in the fact that they are major zones of weakness in the Earth's crust, sometimes extending into the upper mantle. They can be very long-lived features and commonly show evidence of several overprinting stages of activity. Material can be transported upwards or downwards in them, the most important one being water circulating dissolved ions. This can bring about metasomatism in the host rocks and even re-fertilise mantle material.

Shear zones can host economically viable mineralizations, examples being important gold deposits in Precambrian terranes.

== See also ==
- List of shear zones of Great Britain
- Shear (geology)
- Strain partitioning

== Literature ==
- Passchier CW & Trouw RAJ. (1996). Microtectonics. Springer. ISBN 3-540-58713-6
- Ramsay JG & Huber MI. (1987). The Techniques of Modern Structural Geology. Volume 2: Folds and Fractures. Academic Press. ISBN 0-12-576902-4
- Scholz CH. (2002). The mechanics of earthquakes and faulting. Cambridge University Press. ISBN 0-521-65540-4
