= Khader Abu-Seif =

Palestinian copywriter (born c. 1988)

Khader Agami Abu-Seif (Arabic: خضر أغامي أبو سيف; Hebrew: ח'אדר אגמי אבו סייף; born c. 1988) is an Israeli/Palestinian copywriter known for his LGBT rights activism.

== Biography ==
Khader Abu-Seif was born c. 1988 to a Palestinian Arab Muslim family from Jaffa, Tel Aviv, Israel. His grandparents grew up as Arab Palestinians in the British Mandate of Palestine before the formation of the state of Israel. Abu-Seif was raised in Jaffa and is an Arab citizen of Israel but also identifies as a Palestinian.

Abu-Seif is a copywriter and works for Time Out Tel Aviv. In 2015, Abu-Seif was one of three gay Arab activists profiled in the documentary film Oriented. In March 2016, he was featured as "Celebration #109", an exhibit by photographer Xavier Klaine.

Abu-Seif currently works in public relations for the Tel Aviv-Yafo Municipality, where he has been involved in various communications and media efforts. In 27 September 2023, he and his husband, Aviv Agami, welcomed their first child, born through surrogacy in the United States. The couple decided to expand their family and began the surrogacy process abroad, launching a crowdfunding campaign. With significant help from friends, family, and the public, they were able to finance the procedure. As an Arab citizen of Israel and a Jewish Israeli, Abu-Seif and Agami expressed their hope to raise their child in an environment of love, peace, and acceptance, reflecting their shared commitment to coexistence and challenging societal norms.
