= Rick Allmendinger =

American geologist

Richard 'Rick' Allmendinger
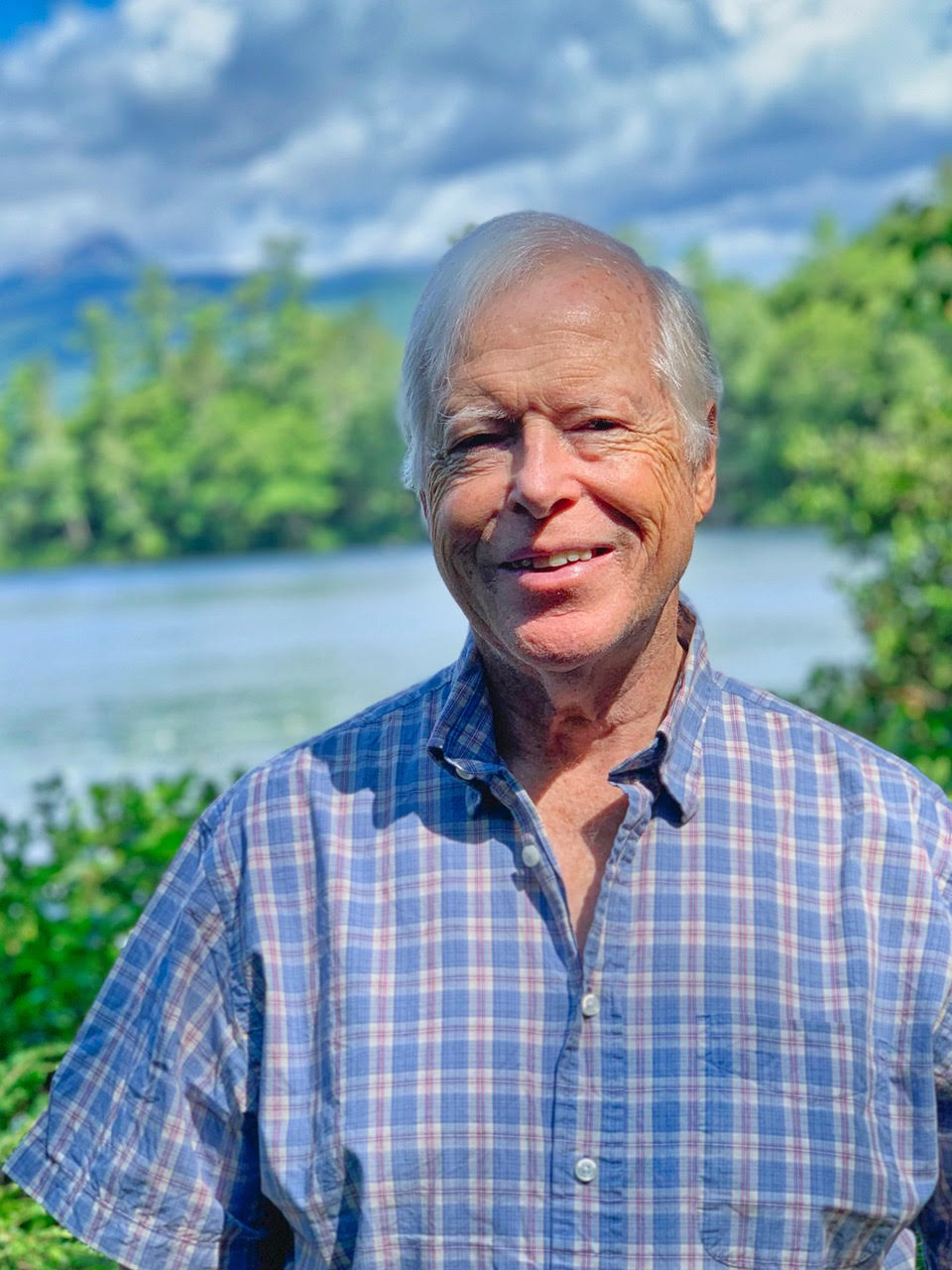
- Other name: Richard Waldron Allmendinger
- Education: Stanford University
- Scientific career
- Fields: structural geology
- Workplaces: Cornell University Stanford University

Richard Waldron Allmendinger is a structural geologist and Professor Emeritus of Earth and Atmospheric Sciences at Cornell University.

His work is focused on energy and climate change as well as earthquakes and the regional tectonics of South America. Some of his biggest contributions to the field of Structural geology are the creation of the stereonet mobile and GeolMapDataExtractor GMDE mobile apps, as well as many other apps and programs.

== Academic career ==
Richard Waldron Allmendinger obtained a BA. in the geological sciences from Cornell University in 1975 where he received distinction in all subjects. He also received a PhD. with a concentration in structural geology from Stanford University in 1979. Allmendinger began his career working as a geologist for the U.S. Geological Survey beginning in 1976 through 1985. Also during this time, he worked as a Research Associate (III) at Cornell University from 1980 through 1984. After this, Allmendinger obtained a position starting as an assistant professor at Cornell University that he has kept at through present day where he is currently an Emeritus professor. He also served as the Associate Dean for the College of Engineering at Cornell from 2008 through 2011. Beginning in 2002, he became a Visiting Professor at the Universidad Católica del Norte in Antofagasta, Chile. Allmendinger has been recognized for his work in structural geology by being inducted as a fellow into the Geological Society of America

== Honors and awards ==
In 2021, Allmendinger was awarded the Paul G. Silver Award for Outstanding Scientific Service in large part due to the multitude of free geology software and instruction he has provided to hundreds of thousands of geologists and students, as well as his teaching and research contributions to the field of geology.

Allmendinger is a Fellow of the Geological Society of America, and in 2012 was awarded the Career Contribution Award from the Geological Society of America for his numerous distinguished contributions that have advanced the science of structural geology and tectonics.

During his time serving as the Associate Dean for Diversity and Faculty Development, the Diversity Programs in Engineering (DPE), which he oversaw, was awarded the 2011 Presidential Award for Excellence in Science, Mathematics, and Engineering Mentoring (PAESMEM) in a ceremony at the White House in December 2011.

Allmendinger is also a Miembro Correspondiente” (Honorary Foreign Fellow) of the Asociación Geológica Argentina.

== Research ==
Allmendinger’s general research interests include structural geology and tectonics, earthquake geology, structural geodesy, numerical kinematic modeling, interpretation of seismic reflection profiles, regional tectonics of South America, and field geology. Allmendinger’s main research aims to answer questions such as: what is the composition and structure of the convergent plate boundary in South America? And how does that structure elucidate the geologic expression? In order to answer these questions, Allmedinger uses methods such as seismic interpretation, GPS and satellite imagery, field work and computer modeling. Aside from his research, Richard is renowned and recognized for his technological contributions to the field of geology due to his widely-used apps and programs.

Allmendinger’s approach to advancing research via technological progression can best be understood by a quote from his own research: “Future technological advances should overcome many of today's uncertainties and provide rich new data to mine by providing denser, more uniform, and temporally continuous observations.”
