= Orientation tensor =

In geology, especially in the study of glacial till, eigenvectors and eigenvalues are used as a method by which a mass of information of a clast fabric's constituents' orientation and dip can be summarized in a 3D space by six numbers. In the field, a geologist may collect such data for hundreds or thousands of clasts in a soil sample, which can only be compared graphically such as in a Tri-Plot (Sneed and Folk) diagram, or as a stereographic projection. The output for the orientation tensor is in the three orthogonal (perpendicular) axes of space.

Eigenvectors output from programs such as Stereo32 are in the order E1 > E2 > E3, with E1 being the primary orientation of clast orientation/dip, E2 being the secondary and E3 being the tertiary, in terms of strength. The clast orientation is defined as the Eigenvector, on a compass rose of 360°. Dip is measured as the Eigenvalue, the modulus of the tensor: this is valued from 0° (no dip) to 90° (vertical). Various values of E1, E2 and E3 mean different things, as can be seen in the book 'A Practical Guide to the Study of Glacial Sediments' by Benn & Evans, 2004.
