= Oriented (film) =

Oriented is a 2015 Israeli-British documentary film directed by Jake Witzenfeld. The film follows the lives of three gay Palestinians living in Tel Aviv over a 15-month period. It is Witzenfeld's first feature documentary. The film premiered at Sheffield Doc/Fest in June 2015.

== Cast ==
- Naeem Jiryes as himself
- Nagham Yacoub as herself
- Fadi Daem as himself
- Khader Abu-Seif as himself

== Reception ==
Amara McLaughlin wrote for Moment that the film is "an intercultural revolution that traverses geography, nationality, religion, sexual orientation and migration."
