= Mica fish =

Roughly fish-shaped mica crystal

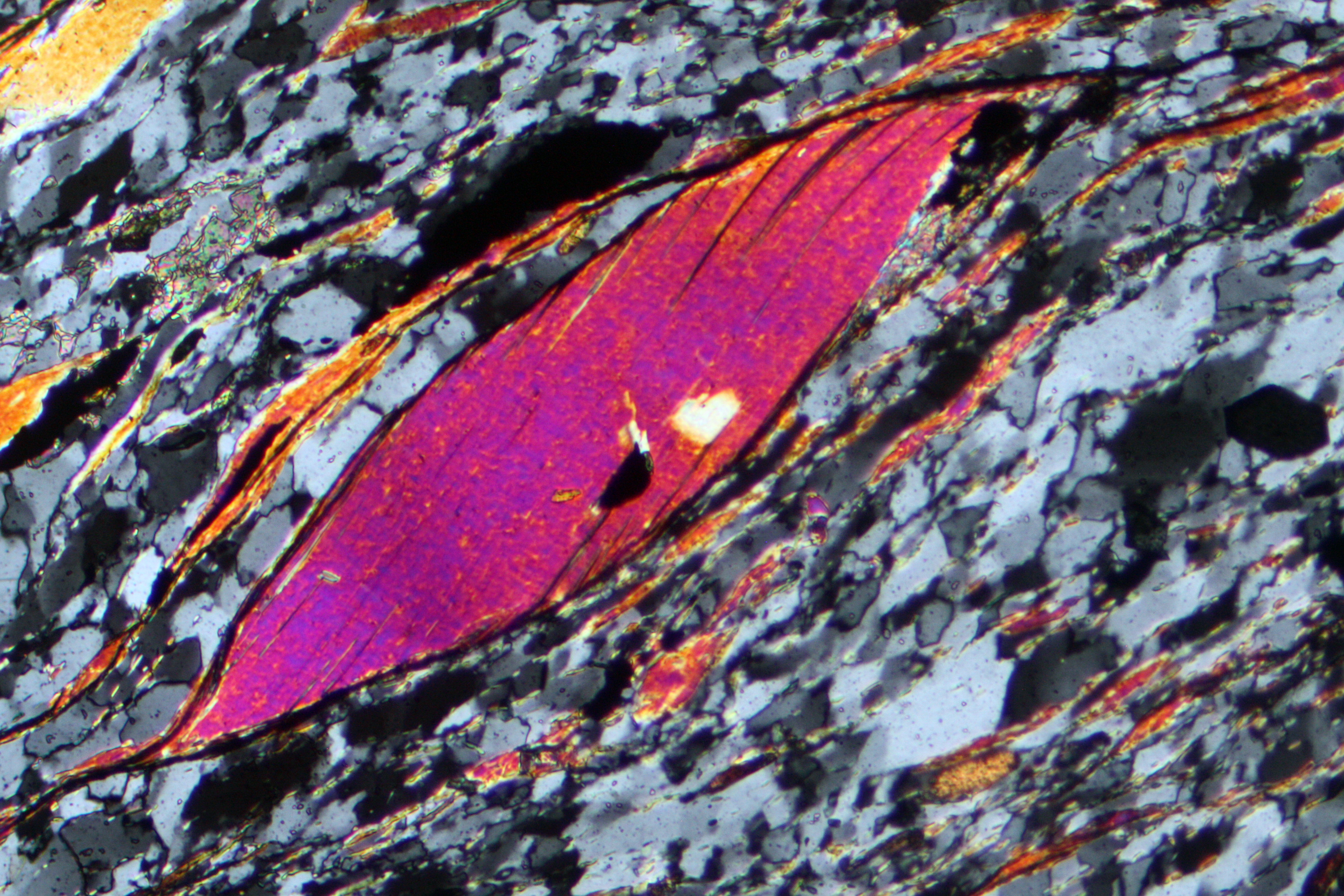
Thin section of a mica fish in mylonitic quartzite from the Italian Alps

Mica fish are lenticular, elongate lozenge, parallelogram-shaped, or lens-shaped (roughly fish-shaped) single mica crystals that are often used as shear sense indicators. They commonly occur in micaceous quartzitic mylonites. They characteristically lie with their longest dimension at a small angle to the mylonitic foliation.
