= Fabric (geology) =

Spatial and geometric configuration of all the elements that make up a rock

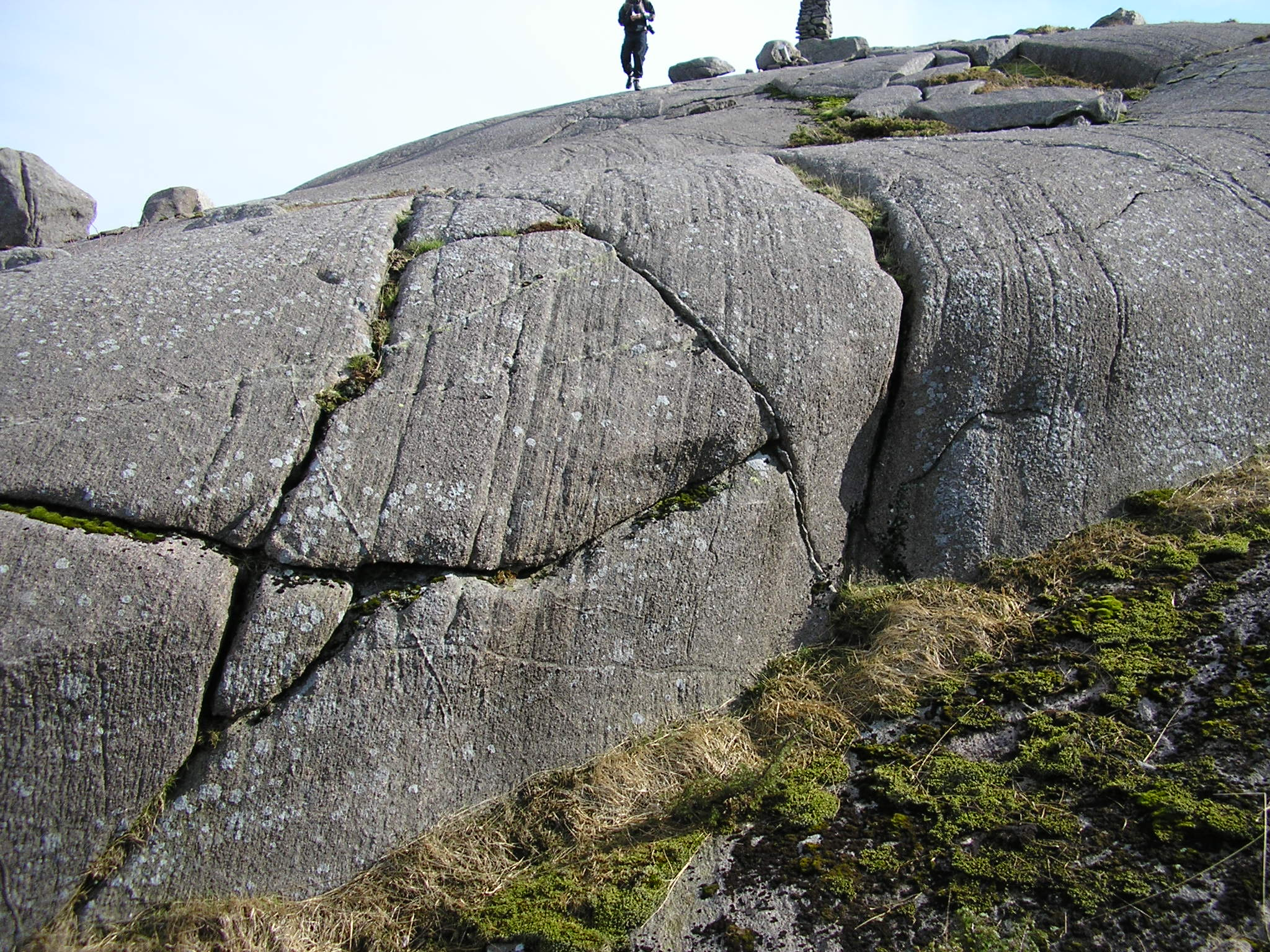
Primary fabric in anorthosite intrusion, Rogaland, Norway

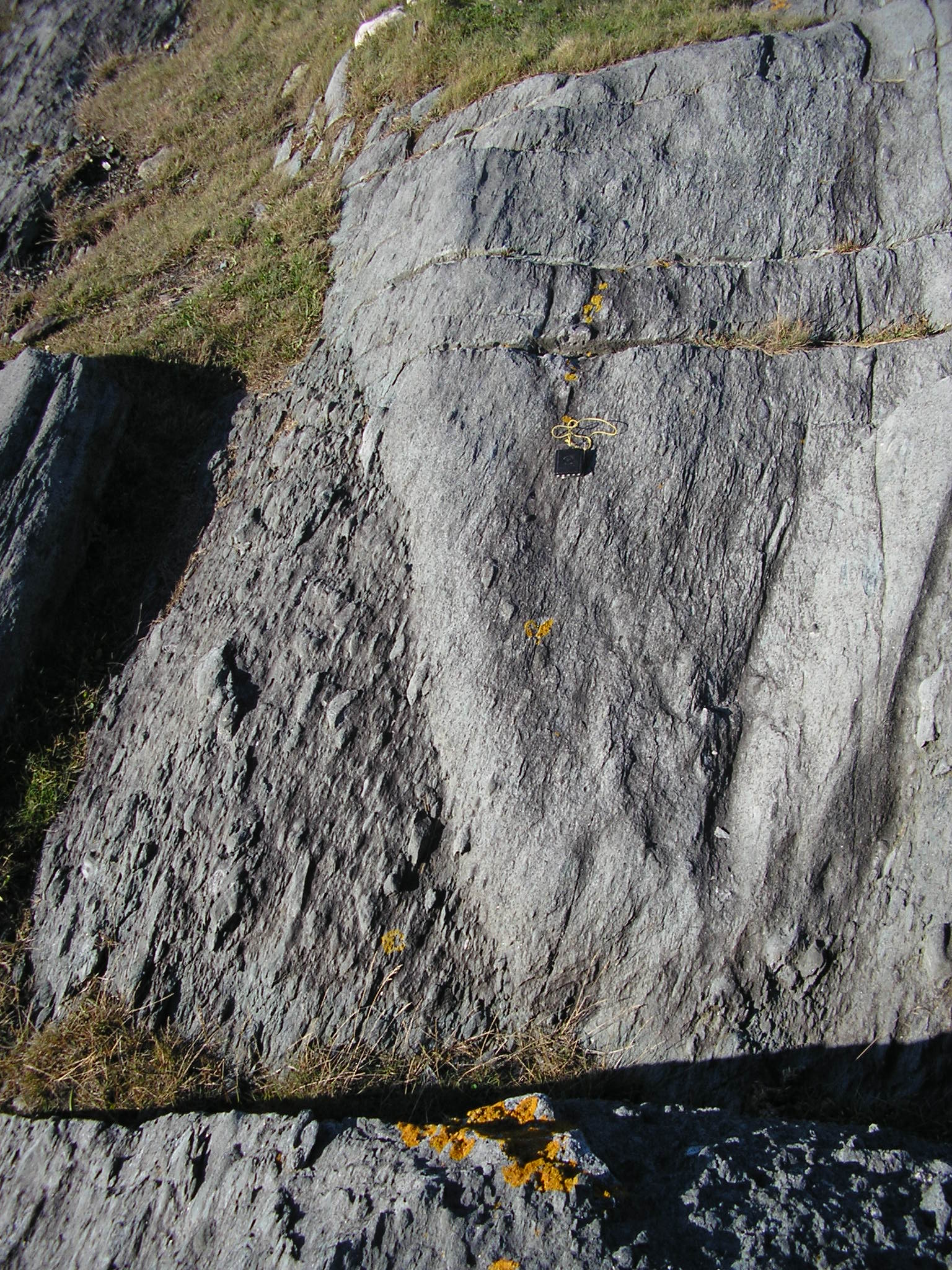
Deformed waterlain volcanic sediments. Primary fabric (bedding) shown by abrupt change in clast size, secondary fabric shown by penetrative S-fabric, cleavage, in fine-grained rock, and by shape fabric in deformed volcanic clasts. Cape Forchu, Nova Scotia

In geology, a rock's fabric describes the spatial and geometric configuration of all the elements that make it up. In sedimentary rocks, the fabric developed depends on the depositional environment and can provide information on current directions at the time of deposition. In structural geology, fabrics may provide information on both the orientation and magnitude of the strains that have affected a particular piece of deformed rock.

== Types of fabric ==
- Primary fabric — a fabric created during the original formation of the rock, e.g. a preferred orientation of clast long axes in a conglomerate, parallel to the flow direction, deposited by a fast waning current.
- Shape fabric — a fabric that is defined by the preferred orientation of inequant elements within the rock, such as platy- or needle-like mineral grains. It may also be formed by the deformation of originally equant elements such as mineral grains.
- Crystallographic preferred orientation — in plastically deformed rocks, the constituent minerals commonly display a preferred orientation of their crystal axes as a result of dislocation processes.
- S-fabric — a planar fabric such as cleavage or foliation; when it forms the dominant fabric in a rock, it may be called an S-tectonite.
- L-fabric — a linear fabric such as mineral stretching lineation where aggregates of recrystallised grains are stretched out into the long axis of the finite strain ellipsoid, where it forms the dominant fabric in a rock, it may be called an L-tectonite.
- Penetrative fabric — a fabric that is present throughout the rock, generally down to the grain scale, although this does also depend on the scale at which the observations take place.
- Magnetic fabric — orientation of magnetic particles within a rock sample or in soils to determine paleomagnetic history or to quantify tectonic strain.

== See also ==
- Rock microstructure
- Texture (geology)
- Orientation tensor
