= Tectonite =

Rock whose structure reflects its history of deformation

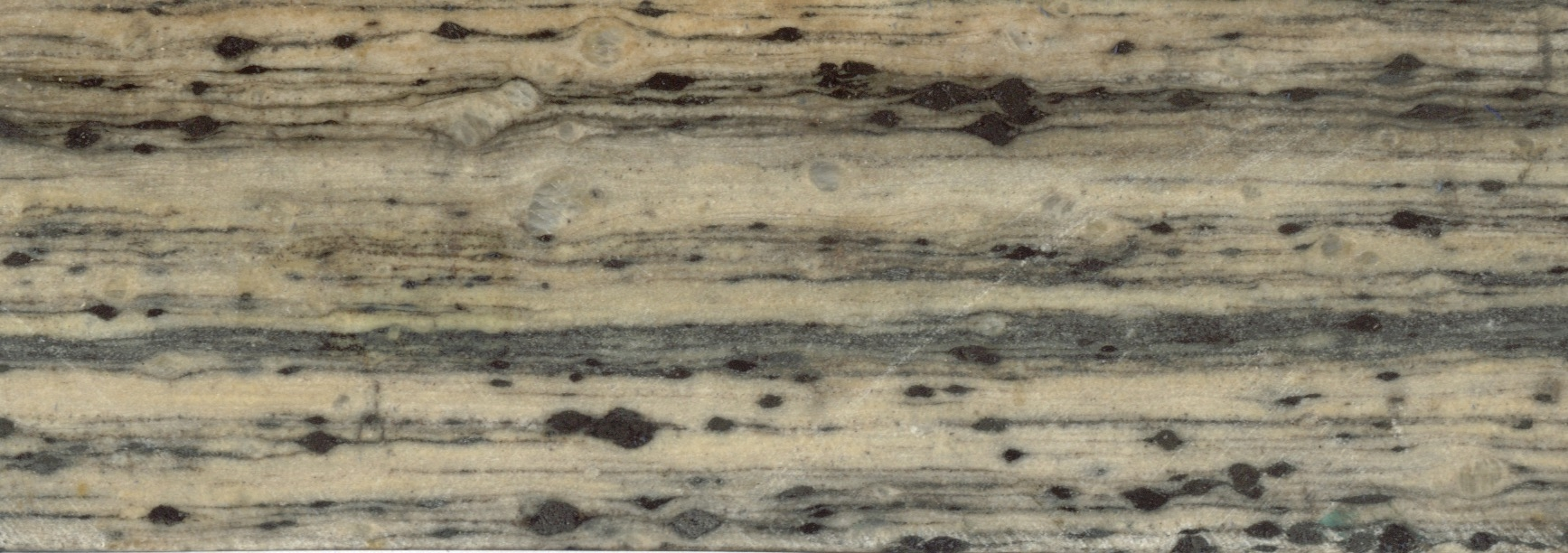
L-S tectonite viewed in the plane of the S fabric

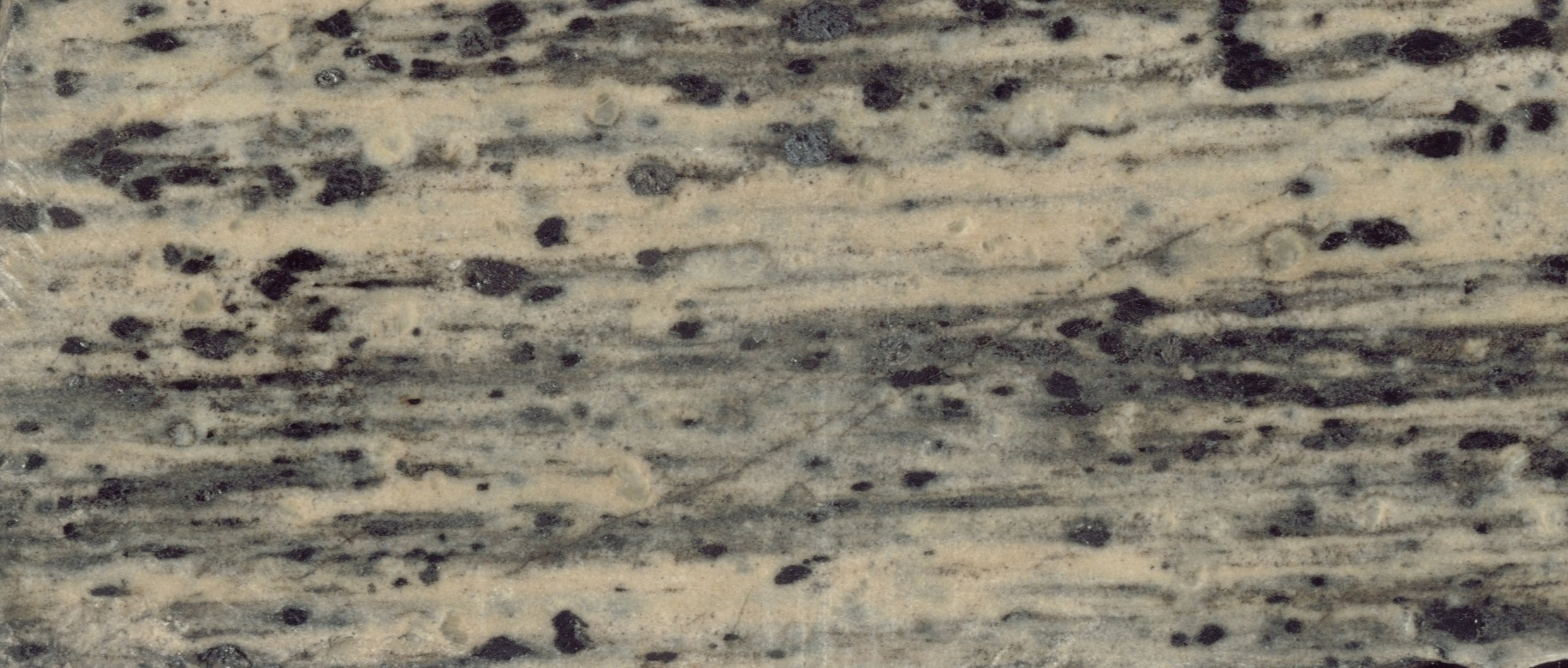
L-S tectonite viewed perpendicular to the plane of the S fabric

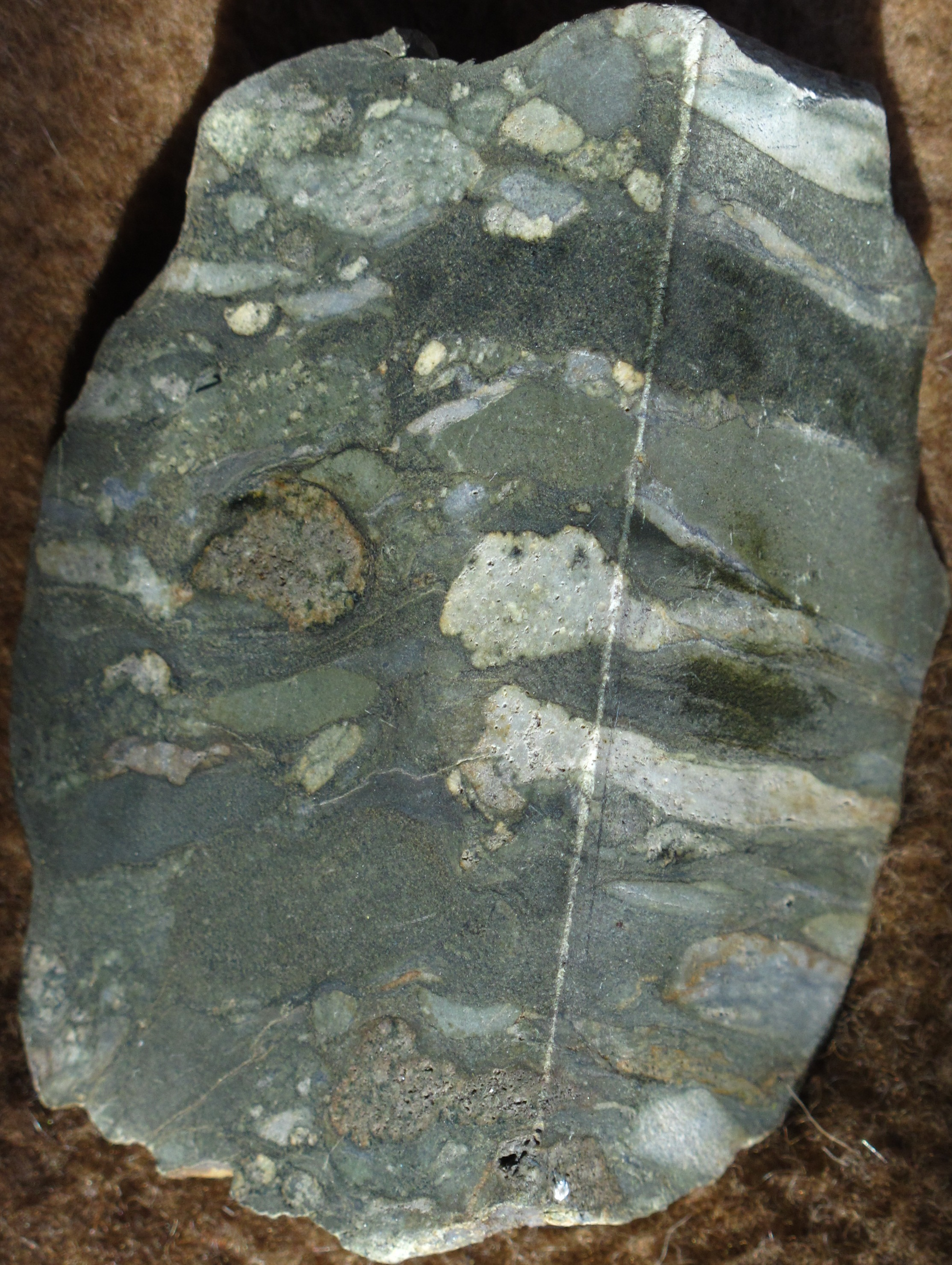
Deformed conglomerate showing no strain in one plane (at left) and strong stretching in the other (at right) – an L-tectonite

In structural geology, tectonites are metamorphic or tectonically-deformed rocks whose fabric reflects the history of their deformation, or rocks with fabric that clearly displays coordinated geometric features that indicate continuous solid (ductile) flow during formation. Planar foliation results from a parallel orientation of platey mineral phases such as the phyllosilicates or graphite. Slender prismatic crystals such as amphibole produce a lineation in which these prisms or columnar crystals become aligned. Tectonites are rocks with minerals that have been affected by natural forces of the earth, which allowed their orientations to change. This usually includes recrystallization of minerals, and the foliation formation. Tectonites are studied through structural analysis and allows for the determination of two things:

- The orientation of shearing and compressive stresses during (dynamic) metamorphism
- The later (or final) stages of metamorphism

According to the nature of mineral orientation, there are three main groups of tectonites, L-tectonites, S-tectonites, and L-S tectonites. The different types reflect the different ways that matter moves.

== Classification ==
- S-tectonites (from the German, Schiefer for schist) have a dominant planar fabric and may indicate a flattening type of strain. This may also be due to a lack of minerals capable of giving a lineation e.g. in a phyllonite.
- L-tectonites have a dominant linear fabric and generally indicate a constrictional type of strain. This may be due to a lack of platey phases.
- L-S tectonites have equally developed linear and planar fabric elements and may indicate a plane strain deformation. Many mylonites are L-S tectonites consistent with a simple shear deformation.
