= Foliation (geology) =

Repetitive layering in metamorphic rocks

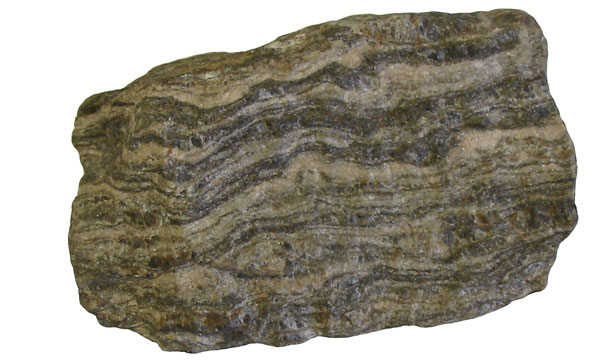
Gneiss, a foliated metamorphic rock.

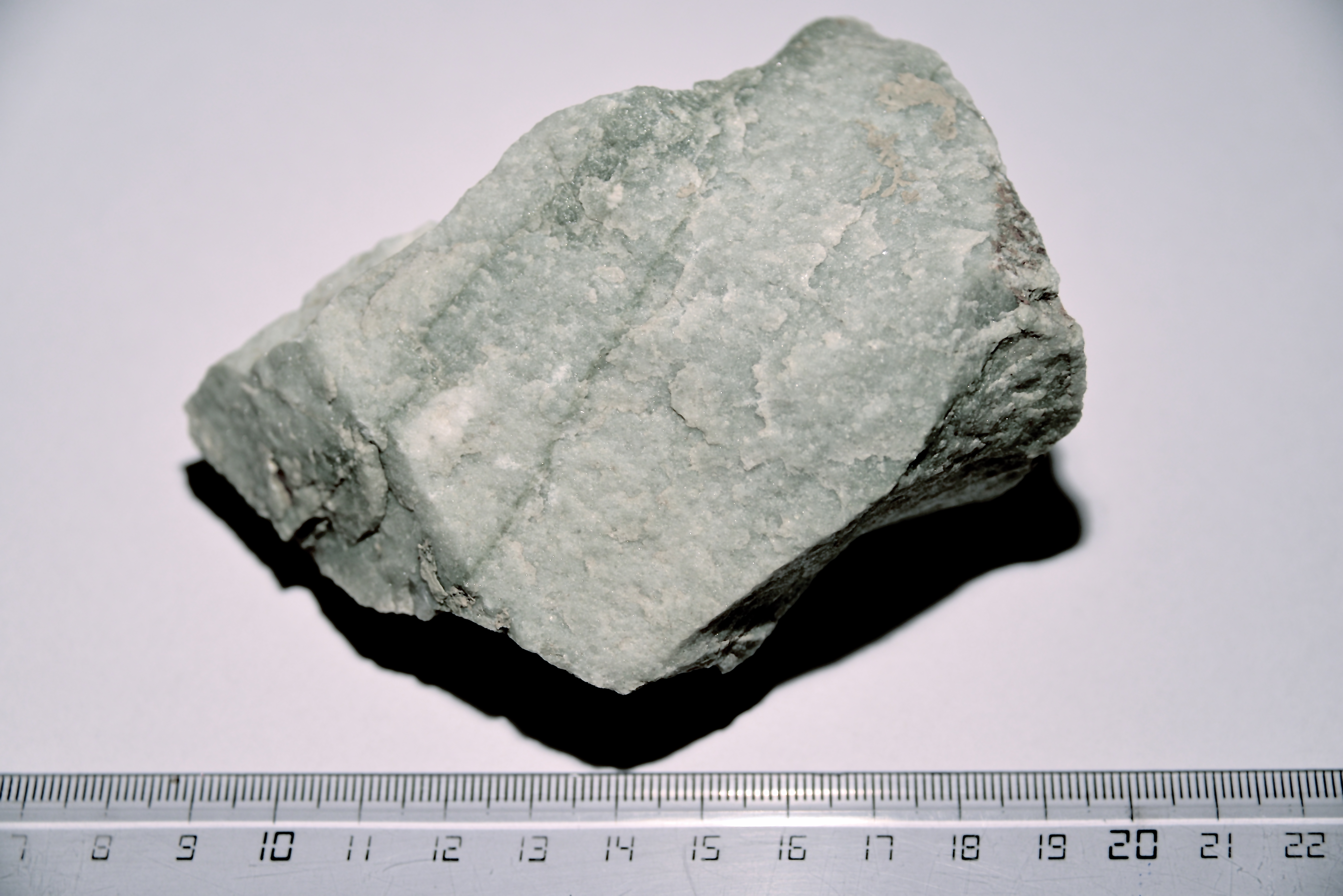
Quartzite, a non-foliated metamorphic rock.

Foliation in geology refers to repetitive layering in metamorphic rocks. Each layer can be as thin as a sheet of paper, or over a meter in thickness. The word comes from the Latin word folium, meaning "leaf", and refers to its sheet-like planar structure. It is caused by shearing forces (pressures pushing different sections of the rock in different directions), or differential pressure (higher pressure from one direction than in others). The layers form parallel to the direction of the shear, or perpendicular to the direction of higher pressure. Nonfoliated metamorphic rocks are typically formed in the absence of significant differential pressure or shear. Foliation is common in rocks affected by the regional metamorphic compression typical of areas of mountain belt formation (orogenic belts).

More technically, foliation is any penetrative planar fabric present in metamorphic rocks. Rocks exhibiting foliation include the standard sequence formed by the prograde metamorphism of mudrocks; slate, phyllite, schist and gneiss. The slatey cleavage typical of slate is due to the preferred orientation of microscopic phyllosilicate crystals. In gneiss, the foliation is more typically represented by compositional banding due to segregation of mineral phases. Foliated rock is also known as S-tectonite in sheared rock masses.

Examples include the bands in gneiss (gneissic banding), a preferred orientation of planar large mica flakes in schist (schistosity), the preferred orientation of small mica flakes in phyllite (with its planes having a silky sheen, called phylitic luster – the Greek word, phyllon, also means "leaf"), the extremely fine grained preferred orientation of clay flakes in slate (called "slaty cleavage"), and the layers of flattened, smeared, pancake-like clasts in metaconglomerate.

== Formation mechanisms ==
Foliation is usually formed by the preferred orientation of minerals within a rock.

Usually, this is the result of some physical force and its effect on the growth of minerals. The planar fabric of a foliation typically forms at right angles to the maximum principal stress direction. In sheared zones, however, planar fabric within a rock may not be directly perpendicular to the principal stress direction due to rotation, mass transport, and shortening.

Foliation may be formed by realignment of micas and clays via physical rotation of the minerals within the rock. Often this foliation is associated with diagenetic metamorphism and low-grade burial metamorphism. Foliation may parallel original sedimentary bedding, but more often is oriented at some angle to it.

The growth of platy minerals, typically of the mica group, is usually a result of prograde metamorphic reactions during deformation. Often, retrograde metamorphism will not form a foliation because the unroofing of a metamorphic belt is not accompanied by significant compressive stress. Thermal metamorphism in the aureole of a granite is also unlikely to result in the growth of mica in a foliation, although the growth of new minerals may overprint existing foliation(s).

Alignment of tabular minerals in metamorphic rocks, igneous rocks and intrusive rocks may form a foliation. Typical examples of metamorphic rocks include porphyroblastic schists where large, oblate minerals form an alignment either due to growth or rotation in the groundmass.

Igneous rocks can become foliated by alignment of cumulate crystals during convection in large magma chambers, especially ultramafic intrusions, and typically plagioclase laths. Granite may form foliation due to frictional drag on viscous magma by the wall rocks. Lavas may preserve a flow foliation, or even compressed eutaxitic texture, typically in highly viscous felsic agglomerate, welded tuff and pyroclastic surge deposits.

Metamorphic differentiation, typical of gneisses, is caused by chemical and compositional banding within the metamorphic rock mass. Usually, this represents the protolith chemistry, which forms distinct mineral assemblages. However, compositional banding can be the result of nucleation processes which cause chemical and mineralogical differentiation into bands. This typically follows the same principle as mica growth, perpendicular to the principal stress. Metamorphic differentiation can be present at angles to protolith compositional banding.

Crenulation cleavage and oblique foliation are particular types of foliation.

== Interpretation ==
Foliation, as it forms generally perpendicular to the direction of principal stress, records the direction of shortening. This is related to the axis of folds, which generally form an axial-planar foliation within their axial regions.

Measurement of the intersection between a fold's axial plane and a surface on the fold will provide the fold plunge. If a foliation does not match the observed plunge of a fold, it is likely associated with a different deformation event.

Foliation in areas of shearing, and within the plane of thrust faults, can provide information on the transport direction or sense of movement on the thrust or shear. Generally, the acute intersection angle shows the direction of transport. Foliations typically bend or curve into a shear, which provides the same information, if it is of a scale which can be observed.

Foliations, in a regional sense, will tend to curve around rigid, incompressible bodies such as granite. Thus, they are not always 'planar' in the strictest sense and may violate the rule of being perpendicular to the regional stress field, due to local influences. This is a megascopic version of what may occur around porphyroblasts. Often, fine observation of foliations on outcrop, hand specimen and on the microscopic scale complements observations on a map or regional scale.

== Description ==
When describing a foliation it is useful to note

- the mineralogy of the folia; this can provide information on the conditions of formation
- the mineralogy in intrafolial areas
- foliation spacing
- any porphyroblasts or minerals associated with the foliation and whether they overprint it or are cut by it
- whether it is planar, undulose, vague or well developed
- its orientation in space, as strike and dip, or dip and dip direction
- its relationship to other foliations, to bedding and any folding
- measure intersection lineations

Following such a methodology allows eventual correlations in style, metamorphic grade, and intensity throughout a region, relationship to faults, shears, structures and mineral assemblages.

== Engineering considerations ==
In geotechnical engineering, a foliation plane may introduce anisotropy of stress, which is a vital consideration for geotechnical engineers. At some point, this foliation may form a discontinuity that may greatly influence the mechanical behavior (strength, deformation, etc.) of rock masses in, for example, tunnel, foundation, or slope construction.

== See also ==
- Cleavage (geology)
- Discontinuity (geotechnical engineering)
- Exfoliating granite
- Fissility (geology)
- Fold (geology)
- List of rock textures
- List of rock types
- Rock microstructure
- Shear (geology)
