= Glossary of geology =

This glossary of geology is a list of definitions of terms and concepts relevant to geology, its sub-disciplines, and related fields. For other terms related to the Earth sciences, see Glossary of geography terms (disambiguation).

== A ==
abiotic
Non-living chemical or physical component of the environment affecting living organisms and the functioning of ecosystems.
abyssal plain
A flat or very gently sloping area on the floor of a deep ocean basin.
absolute dating
The process of determining a specific date (in years or some other unit of time) for an archaeological, geological or paleontological site or artifact.
accident
A sudden discontinuity of ground, such as a fault of great thickness, bed or lentil of unstable ground.
accretion
A process by which material is added to a tectonic plate or landmass.
achnelith
A small, glassy volcanic bomb, sphere, dumbbell, or droplet-shaped stone resulting from very liquid magma.
acid rock
The groups ultrabasic, basic, intermediate and acid constitute a series with progressively increasing SiO_{2} content.
aftershock
A small earthquake that follows a main shock.
agglomerate
An indurated rock built of large angular rock fragments embedded in an ashy matrix and resulting from explosive volcanic activity. Occurs typically in volcanic vents.
aggregate
A mass consisting of rock or mineral fragments.
albite
The end member of the plagioclase group of minerals, ideally consisting of silicates of sodium and aluminium, but commonly containing small quantities of potash and lime in addition. Compare barbierite.
alkaline
A highly basic substance that dissolves in water.
alkaline rock
A type of rock characterized by a high content of Na_{2}O and K_{2}O relative to the other oxides. They occur throughout the range from ultrabasic to acid, but have their strongest expression in the acid-intermediate part of the range.
allochthon
A fossil, sediment, or rock that was formed elsewhere and later transported into the location where it is presently found, usually by low angle thrust faulting. An object of this type is referred to as allochthonous. Contrast autochthon.
alluvial fan
A fan-shaped deposit formed where a fast flowing stream flattens, slows, and spreads typically at the exit of a canyon onto a flatter plain.
alluvium
Soil or sediments deposited by a river or other running water.
amber
Fossilized resin or tree sap that is appreciated for its vivid colour, usually reddish-orange to gold or yellow.
amphibole
An important group of dark-coloured, rock-forming silicate minerals, including hornblende, the commonest.
amphibolite
A crystalline, coarse-grained rock, containing amphibole as an essential constituent, together with feldspar and frequently garnet. Like hornblende schist, amphibolite is formed by regional metamorphism of basic igneous rocks, but is not foliated.
amygdaloidal
Amygdules or amygdales form when the gas bubbles or vesicles in volcanic lava (or other extrusive igneous rocks) are infilled with a secondary mineral such as calcite, quartz, chlorite or one of the zeolites. Rocks containing amygdules can be described as amygdaloidal.
anatexis
Melting of pre-existing rock. Compare metatexis, diatexis, and syntexis.
andalusite
One of several crystalline forms of aluminium silicate; a characteristic product of the contact metamorphism of argillaceous rocks.
andesite
Fine-grained igneous rock of intermediate composition. Up to half of the rock is plagioclase feldspar with the rest being ferromagnesian minerals.
angular unconformity
An unconformity in which younger strata overlie an erosion surface of tilted or folded layered rock.
anorthite

A mineral from the lime-rich end of the plagioclase group of minerals. Anorthites are usually silicates of calcium and aluminium occurring in some basic igneous rocks, typically those produced by the contact metamorphism of impure calcareous sediments.
anticline
An arched fold in which the layers usually dip away from the fold axis. Contrast syncline.
aphanic
Having the texture of carbonate sedimentary rocks characterized by individual crystals or clastic grains less than 0.01 mm in diameter.
aphanitic
Said of the texture of igneous rock in which the crystalline components are not distinguishable by the naked eye. Both microcrystalline and cryptocrystalline textures are included.
aplogranite
A light-coloured rock of granitic texture consisting mainly of alkali feldspar and quartz, with subordinate biotite; muscovite may be present.
aquifer
A body of saturated rock or sediment through which water can move readily.
aragonite sea
Contains aragonite and high-magnesium calcite as the primary inorganic carbonate precipitates.
Archean Eon
The oldest eon of the Earth's history.
archipelago
A chain or cluster of islands.
arenaceous
Sediments consisting essentially of sand grains; that is, of quartz and rock fragments down to 0.005mm in size. Conglomerates, sandstones, grits and siltstones fall into this category. Particle size 2mm to 1/16mm.
arenite
1. A general term for any consolidated sedimentary rock composed of sand-sized fragments.
2. “Clean” sandstone, well-sorted, less than 10% argillaceous matrix. Opposite to Wacke.
arenitic
Pertaining to, having the quality of, or resembling sandstone.
arkose
An arenaceous sedimentary rock. Like sandstone in its general character but containing feldspar to at least 10%. Formed by the disintegration of the acid igneous rocks and gneisses.
argillaceous
Sedimentary rocks of the clay grade, i.e. composed of minute mineral fragments and crystals less than 0.005 mm in diameter, as well as large amounts of colloidal material. Apart from finely divided detrital matter, they consist of the so-called clay minerals, such as montmorillonite, kaolinite, gibbsite and diaspore. Siltstones, mudstones, shales, clays, etc. may all be referred to as argillaceous.
ash
Fragments less than 2 mm (0.079 in) in diameter of pulverized rock, minerals and volcanic glass, created during volcanic eruptions.
asphalt
A sticky, black and highly viscous liquid or semi-solid that is present in most crude petroleums and in some natural deposits.
assembled gem

asthenosphere
A region of the Earth's outer shell beneath the lithosphere. The asthenosphere is of indeterminate thickness and behaves plastically.
augite
A complex aluminous silicate of calcium, iron and magnesium, crystallising in the monoclinic system, and occurring in many igneous rocks, particularly those of basic composition. It is an essential component of basalt, dolerite and gabbro.
aureole
A zone surrounding an igneous intrusion in which country rock shows effects of contact metamorphism.
autochthon
A fossil, sediment, or rock that was formed or produced in the location where it is now found. The term is widely applied to a coal or peat that originated at the place where the plants comprising it grew and decayed and to rocks that have not been displaced by overthrust faulting. An object of this type is referred to as autochthonous. Contrast allochthon.

== B ==
bajada
A series of coalescing alluvial fans along a mountain front.
banded iron formation
A distinctive type of rock often found in primordial sedimentary rocks.
basalt
A fine-grained, mafic igneous rock composed predominantly of ferromagnesian minerals and with lesser amounts of calcium-rich plagioclase feldspar.
basement rock
The thick foundation of ancient, and oldest metamorphic and igneous rock that forms the crust of continents, often in the form of granite.
basic rock
Igneous rock with low silica content (<54%). The groups ultrabasic, basic, intermediate, and acid constitute a series with progressively increasing SiO_{2} content.
basin
A landform scooped out by water erosion.
Basin and Range Province
A particular topography covering much of the southwestern United States and northwestern Mexico that is typified by elongate north-south trending arid valleys bounded by mountain ranges which also bound adjacent valleys.
batholith
A large discordant pluton with an outcropping area greater than 100 square kilometres (39 sq mi).
bedrock
Native consolidated rock underlying the loose rock or soil surface of the Earth.
Before Present (BP)
bentonite
Swelling clay minerals of the smectite group with many industrial applications (drilling mud, expansive backfill materials…). The name bentonite is inherited from Fort Benton in Wyoming where large swelling clay deposits exist. See also smectite and montmorillonite.
bioerosion
The erosion of hard ocean substrates by living organisms through various biological mechanisms.
biogenic
Of biological origin – Produced by the present or past activity of living organisms, or by a biological process.
bioherm
Landform of organic sedimentary rock enclosed or surrounded by rock of different origin.
biostratigraphy
A branch of stratigraphy which focuses on correlating and assigning relative ages of rock strata by using the fossil assemblages contained within them.
biostratinomy
The study of the processes that take place after an organism dies but before its final burial.
biostrome
A distinctly bedded or broadly lenticular sedimentary rock landform.
biotic
Of biological origin – Produced by the present or past activity of living organisms, or by a biological process.
biotite
A form of black mica widely distributed in igneous rocks (particularly in granites) as lustrous black crystals, with a singularly perfect cleavage. In composition it is a complex silicate, chiefly of iron and magnesium, together with potassium and hydroxyl.
bioturbation
The displacement and mixing of sediment particles by benthic fauna (animals) or flora (plants).
blueschist
A rock that forms by the metamorphism of basalt or rocks of similar composition at high pressures and low temperatures, approximately corresponding to a depth of to and a temperature of to.
boudin
A structure formed by extension, in which a rigid tabular body such as a bed of sandstone is stretched and deformed amidst less competent beds. See also boudinage.
boulder
Bowen's reaction series
The sequence in which minerals crystallize from a cooling basaltic magma.
brackish
Water with a salinity higher than freshwater but lower than seawater.
breadcrust bomb
A rounded, smooth-surfaced volcanic bomb with a cracked surface resembling a cracked crust of bread, hence the name.
breccia
A coarse-grained clastic rock consisting largely of angular fragments of existing rocks.
buckling
A failure mode of a rock subjected to high compressive stresses, where the actual compressive stress at the point of failure is less than the ultimate compressive stresses that the material is capable of withstanding. Typically, folding is thought to occur by simple buckling of a planar surface and its confining volume. The volume change is accommodated by layer parallel shortening the volume, which grows in thickness.

== C ==
calcareous
Formed from or containing a high proportion of calcium carbonate in the form of calcite or aragonite, used of a sediment, sedimentary rock, or soil type.
calcite
A mineral that is the crystalline form of calcium carbonate (CaCO_{3}), showing trigonal symmetry and a great variety of mineral habits. It is one of the commonest of minerals in association with both igneous and sedimentary rocks.
calcite sea
A body of water in which low-magnesium calcite is the primary inorganic marine calcium carbonate precipitate.
calcrete
1. A conglomerate of surficial sand and gravel cemented by calcium carbonate precipitated from solution.
2. A calcareous duricrust.
caldera
A volcanic feature formed by the collapse of land following a volcanic eruption.
Cambrian
The earliest geologic period of the Paleozoic Era, lasting from 541.0 ± 1.0 to 485.4 ± 1.9 million years ago and succeeded by the Ordovician.
carbon film
A type of fossil or preservation.
carbonate
A salt or ester of carbonic acid.
carbonate hardgrounds
Surfaces of synsedimentarily-cemented carbonate layers that have been exposed on the seafloor.
casting
The process which occurs when a liquid fills a cavity and then solidifies. If the cavity originated from the decomposition of dead organisms, casting may result in the formation of fossils.
Cenozoic Era
The most recent of the geological eras, which followed the Mesozoic Era.
chalk
A soft, white, porous sedimentary rock, a form of limestone composed of calcite coccolith plates.
chert
A fine-grained, silica-rich, microcrystalline, cryptocrystalline or microfibrous sedimentary rock that sometimes contains small fossils.
chlorite
Any of a set of allied non-swelling 2:1 (TOT) clay minerals which may be regarded as hydrated silicates of aluminium, iron, and magnesium. Their non-accessible interlayer is filled by a brucite bridge (Mg(OH)_{2}, or sometimes Fe(OH)_{2}). They crystallise in the monoclinic system and are green in colour. They occur as alteration products of such minerals as biotite and hornblende, and also in schistose rocks.
clast
Any individual constituent grain or fragment of a sediment or rock produced by mechanical weathering of a rock mass.
clastic rocks
Mechanically redeposited remains of eroded older rocks; i.e. rocks formed of fragments, or clasts, of pre-existing rocks.
clay
cleavage
The tendency of a rock to break along preferred planes of weakness, caused by the development of a planar fabric as a result of deformation.
cobble
coccolith
An individual plate of calcium carbonate formed by coccolithophores which are arranged around them in a so-called coccosphere.
coccolithophore

A type of microfossil of single-celled algae, protists and phytoplankton belonging to the division of haptophytes. These fossils are distinguished by special calcium carbonate plates called coccoliths.
compaction
The process by which a newly deposited sediment decreases its porosity and progressively expels its original pore water due to the effects of loading. This forms part of the process of lithification.
compression
The process by which rocks shorten or decrease in volume when exposed to certain forces.
conchoidal
A type of fracture that results in smoothly curved surface faces.
concretion
A volume of sedimentary rock in which a mineral cement fills the porosity (i.e. the spaces between the sediment grains). Not to be confused with nodule.
conglomerate
Any type of rock consisting of individual stones that have become cemented together.
contact metamorphism
Metamorphism due to the local heating of rocks by the intrusion of magma nearby.
continental crust
The layer of granitic, sedimentary, and metamorphic rocks which form the parts of the Earth's crust that comprise the continents, and the areas of shallow seabed close to their shores (known as continental shelves).
continental margin
Zone of the ocean floor, separating the thin oceanic crust from thicker continental crust.
continental shelf
Extended perimeter of a continent and its associated coastal plain, which is covered, during interglacial periods (such as the current epoch), by gulfs, and relatively shallow seas known as shelf seas.
convergent boundary
The boundary between two tectonic plates that are moving toward each other. Contrast divergent boundary.
copal
A type of resin produced by plant or tree secretions, particularly identified with the forms of aromatic tree resins used by the cultures of pre-Columbian Mesoamerica as a ceremonially burned incense, as well as for a number of other purposes.
coprolite
A fossilized specimen of human or animal dung.
cordierite
A silicate of aluminium, iron and magnesium with water, which crystallises in the orthorhombic system and occurs mainly in metamorphic rocks.
core
The innermost layer(s) of a planet, referring especially to the Earth's core.
corestone
An ellipsoidal or broadly rectangular joint block of granite formed by subsurface weathering in the same manner as a tor but entirely separated from bedrock.
country rock
The rock native to an area, as opposed to rock that formed elsewhere and was later transported to the area.
craton
An old and stable part of the continental crust that has survived the merging and splitting of continents and supercontinents for at least 500 million years.
cross-bedding
An inclined sedimentary structure in a horizontal unit of rock. Such tilted structures indicate the type of depositional environment, not post-depositional deformation.
crude oil
A liquid mixture of naturally occurring hydrocarbons.
crust
The outermost solid layer of a planet or moon, referring especially to the Earth's crust.
cryptocrystalline
crystal
crystal habit
crystallinity

== D ==
dacite
An igneous, volcanic rock with a high iron content. It is an extrusive rock of the same general composition as andesite, but a less calcic feldspar. Synonymous with quartz andesite.
daughter product
Any distinct isotope produced by the radioactive decay of an atomic nucleus.
delta
A landform where the mouth of a river flows into an ocean, sea, desert, estuary, lake or another river.
degradation
The lowering of a fluvial surface, such as a stream bed or floodplain, through erosional processes.
dendrite
A crystal that develops with a typical multi-branching tree-like form.
denudation
The lowering of the earth's surface through chemical and physical weathering.
deposition
The geological process by which material is added to a landform or landmass.
detachment fault
A major fault in a mountain belt above which rocks have been intensely folded or faulted.
diagenesis
The process of chemical, physical, or biological change undergone by a sediment after its initial deposition and during and after its lithification, exclusive of surface alteration (weathering) and metamorphism.
diamictite
A comprehensive non-generic term for a non-sorted or poorly sorted non-calcareous terrigenous sedimentary rock that contains a wide range of particle sizes such as rock with sand or larger particles in a muddy matrix.
diapir
A type of intrusion in which a more mobile and ductilely deformable material is forced into brittle overlying rocks; a dome or anticlinal fold of the overlaying rocks which has been ruptured by the squeezing out of the plastic core material.
diatomite
A soft, chalk-like sedimentary rock that is easily crumbled into a fine white to off-white powder.
diopside
A monoclinic pyroxene, ideally consisting of silicate of calcium and magnesium, but commonly containing a variable content of FeSi2O6 in addition, and then strictly known as ferriferous diopside.
diorite
A grey to dark grey intermediate intrusive igneous rock composed principally of plagioclase feldspar (typically andesine), biotite, hornblende, and/or pyroxene.
dike

A type of sheet intrusion referring to any geologic body that cuts discordantly across. A form of minor intrusion injected into the crust during its subjection to tension, the dyke being thin with parallel sides, and maintaining a constant direction in some cases for long distances. Some are more resistant to weathering than the surrounding rock and stand up like walls, while others weather faster and form long narrow depressions.
dip slope
A geological formation often created by erosion of tilted strata.
disconformity
A surface that represents missing rock strata but beds above and below that surface are parallel to one another.
divergent boundary
The boundary separating two tectonic plates that are moving away from each other. Contrast convergent boundary.
dolomite
A sedimentary carbonate rock and mineral, both composed of crystalline calcium magnesium carbonate CaMg(CO_{3})_{2}.
dolerite
1. A basic igneous rock of medium grain size, occurring as minor intrusions or in the central parts of thick lava flows.
2. A dark-coloured, basic, igneous rock, composed essentially of pyroxene and a triclinic feldspar with magnetic iron. Considered by some authors to be equivalent to a coarse-grained basalt.
3. A dark, crystalline, igneous rock, chiefly pyroxene with labradorite.
4. Coarse-grained basalt.
5. Diabase.
6. Any dark igneous rock composed chiefly of silicates of iron and magnesium with some feldspar.
dome
A geological formation consisting of symmetrical anticlines that intersect each other at their respective apices.
drill core
A drill specifically designed to remove a cylinder of material, much like a hole saw.
drumlin
An elongated, whale-shaped hill formed by glacial action.
dunite
An ultrabasic plutonic rock in which the mafic material is almost entirely olivine, with accessory chromite almost always present. Feldspar mainly plagioclase. See also peridotite.
duricrust
A general term for hard crust existing as a layer in or on the surface of the upper horizons of a soil in semi-arid climates. Duricrust is formed by the accumulation of solid minerals deposited by water moving upwards by capillary action and evaporating in the dry season. Compare hardpan.

== E ==
earthquake
eclogite
A generally coarse- to medium-grained pyroxene in which are set red garnets. The colour is pistachio green when fresh, but mottled with red when weathered.
Eemian transgression
The portion of the Late Pleistocene spanning the period between 120 Ka and 8m before present.
eon
The largest unit of geologic time.
epicenter
The point on the Earth's surface that is directly above the hypocenter or focus at which an earthquake or underground explosion originates.
epidiorite
Any of a set of altered gabbroic and doleritic rocks in which the original pyroxene has been replaced by fibrous amphibole. The rock may be regarded as a first step in the conversion by dynamothermal metamorphism of a basic igneous rock into a green schist.
epirogenetic
The simultaneous rising and falling movements of continents, maintaining isostasy.
epoch
A division of the standard geologic time scale subordinate to periods. An example is the Pleistocene Epoch of the Quaternary Period.
erosion
The displacement of solids (sediment, soil, rock and other particles) usually by the agents of currents such as wind, water, or ice by downward or down-slope movement in response to gravity or by living organisms (in the case of bioerosion).
erratic
A piece of rock that deviates from the size and type of rock native to the area in which it rests. Erratics usually occur as stones ranging in size from pebbles to large boulders which were transported by glacial ice, which upon melting left them stranded far from their original source. The name "erratic" is based on the errant location of these boulders.
escarpment
A transition zone between different physiogeographic provinces that involves an elevation differential, characterized by a cliff or steep slope.
esker
A long, winding ridge of stratified sand and gravel, examples of which occur in glaciated and formerly glaciated regions of Europe and North America. Eskers are frequently several miles in length and, because of their peculiar uniform shape, somewhat resemble railroad embankments.
estuary
A semi-enclosed coastal body of water with one or more rivers or streams flowing into it, and with a free connection to the open sea.
eugeosyncline
A geosyncline in which volcanism is associated with clastic sedimentation; the volcanic part of an orthosyncline located away from the craton.
euhedral
Bounded by the crystal faces peculiar to the species, used of minerals. Synonymous with idiomorphic.
eustatic movements
Changes of sea level, constant over wide areas, due to alterations in the volume of the oceans resulting from the formation or melting of ice caps.
evaporite
Any of a diverse set of water-soluble mineral sediments that result from the evaporation of bodies of surface water.
exfoliation
The stripping of concentric rock slabs from the outer surface of a rock mass.
extension
Strain involving an increase in length. Extension can cause thinning and faulting.
extrusive
A mode of igneous volcanic rock formation in which hot magma from inside the Earth flows out (extrudes) onto the surface as lava or explodes violently into the atmosphere to fall back as pyroclastics or tuff.

== F ==
facies
The sum of the lithological and faunal characters of a sediment is its facies. Lithological facies involves composition, grain size, texture, colour, as well as such mass characteristics as current bedding, nature of stratification, ripple marks, etc. Similarly, metamorphic facies involves the degree of crystallisation and the mineral assemblage in a group of metamorphic rocks.
fanning
Rock deformation related to shear stress.
fault
A discrete planar rock fracture which shows evidence of a displacement (the throw of the fault). A fault is a discrete surface.
fault zone
The zone where exist different discrete fault planes.
feldspar
Any of a set of the most common minerals in the Earth's crust. All feldspars contain silicon, aluminium, and oxygen and may contain potassium, calcium and sodium.
fels
A massive metamorphic rock lacking schistosity or foliation.
felsic
Silicate minerals, magmas, and rocks which are enriched in the lighter elements such as silicon, oxygen, aluminium, sodium, and potassium. Light minerals (quartz and feldspar) greater than 60% - acid. [Granite (Rhyolite), Adamellite (Rhyo-dacite), Granodiorite (Dacite)]. The term is a mnemonic adjective for igneous rocks having light-coloured minerals in their mode, from "feldspar" and "silica". Contrast mafic.
ferricrete
A conglomerate consisting of surficial sand and gravel cemented into a hard mass by iron oxide derived from oxidation of percolating solution of iron salts. A ferruginous duricrust.
ferromagnesian mineral
Any iron/magnesium-bearing mineral, such as augite, hornblende, olivine, or biotite.
fission track dating
A method that uses tracks that are visible under the microscope to date minerals.
Flandrian transgression
fold
A stack of originally flat and planar surfaces, such as sedimentary strata, which have become bent or curved as a result of plastic (i.e. permanent) deformation.
foliation
The parallel alignment of textural and structural features of a rock.
fossil
Any mineralized or otherwise preserved remains or traces (such as footprints) of animals, plants, or other once-living organisms.
fossiliferous
Bearing or being composed of fossils in rocks or strata.
fossilization
fracture
Any crack or discontinuity. In its geological definition, it is only used when no displacement can be distinguished.
fumarole
A vent in the Earth's surface from which hot gases and vapors are emitted.

== G ==
Ga
A non-standard but widely used abbreviation for one billion (1,000,000,000) years, using the metric prefix G (for "Giga") to indicate a quantity of one billion. When not otherwise qualified, it usually indicates 1,000,000,000 years Before Present (or 1,000,000,000 years ago).
gabbro
A dark, coarse-grained, intrusive igneous rock chemically equivalent to basalt.
garnet
gastrolith
A rock which is or was once held inside the digestive tract of a living animal.
gemology

The branch of geology and mineralogy that studies natural and artificial gemstones.
gemstone

geogenic
Of geologic origin – Resulting from naturally occurring geological processes.
geological map
A special-purpose map made to show geological features.
geological time scale

geology
geosyncline
A mobile down-warping of the Earth's crust, either elongate or basin-like, measured in scores of kilometres, which is subsiding as sedimentary and volcanic rocks accumulate to thicknesses of thousands of metres.
glass
Amorphous (non-crystalline) hard and brittle solid such as soda-lime glass.
glauconite
A green-coloured, hydrated silicate mineral of potassium and iron that forms on submerged banks. Its occurrence in sands and sandstones is considered an indication of accumulation under marine conditions.
gneiss
A coarse-grained, pale-coloured gneissose rock, containing abundant feldspar with quartz, mica, hornblende, and garnet.
Gondwanaland
The southern part of the supercontinent of Pangaea which eventually separated to form present-day South America, Africa, India, Australia and Antarctica.
graben
A depressed block of the Earth's crust bordered by parallel faults.
granite
A coarse-grained, often porphyritic, intrusive, felsic, igneous rock containing megascopic quartz, averaging 25%, much feldspar (orthoclase, microcline, sodic plagioclase) and mica or other coloured minerals. Rhyolite is the volcanic equivalent.
granitoid
Any granite-like rock, including granodiorite, diorite, monzonite, and granite itself, among others.
granoblastic
An arrangement of mineral grains in a rock of metamorphic origin similar to that of a normal granite, but produced by recrystallisation in the solid and not by crystallisation from a molten condition.
granodiorite
An intrusive, felsic, igneous rock similar to granite but containing more plagioclase than potassium feldspar. Dacite is the volcanic equivalent.
granulometry
Statistical distribution of the size of individual sediment grains, or lithified particles in clastic rocks.
gravel
graywacke

A variety of sandstone generally characterized by its hardness, dark colour, and poorly sorted, angular grains of quartz, feldspar, and small rock fragments (lithic fragments) set in a compact, clay-fine matrix.
greenstone
An omnibus term lacking precision and applied indiscriminately to basic and intermediate igneous rocks of Lower Paleozoic age in which much chlorite has been produced at the expense of the original coloured minerals, staining the rocks green.
grus
Freshly eroded, angular grains of quartz and feldspar derived from a granitoid.

== H ==
habit
See crystal habit.
half-life
The time it takes for a given amount of a radioactive isotope to be reduced by one-half.
hardpan
hemicrystalline
Having the properties of certain rocks of igneous origin which contain some interstitial glass in addition to crystalline minerals. Contrast holocrystalline.
hinge
The zone of maximum curvature of a fold.
hinge line
A line joining the points of maximum curvature along the hinge of a fold.
holocrystalline
Having the properties of those igneous rocks in which all of the components are crystalline; glass is absent. Contrast hemicrystalline.
hornblende
An important rock-forming mineral of complex composition, essentially a silicate of calcium, magnesium and iron, with smaller amounts of potash, soda and hydroxyl. Hornblende crystallises in the monoclinic system and occurs as black crystals or grains in many different types of igneous and metamorphic rocks, including hornblende-granite, syenite, diorite, andesite, hornblende-schist, and amphibole.
hornfels
A hard, compact, fine-textured contact-altered argillaceous rock that breaks into splintery fragments.
horst
A raised fault block bounded by normal faults.
hot spring
A natural spring resulting from the emergence of geothermally heated groundwater from beneath the Earth's crust.
hydrothermal
Pertaining to the actions or products of heated water.
hydrothermal vent
A fissure in a planet's surface from which geothermally heated water emerges.
hypersaline
Having a saltiness or dissolved salt content greater than that of seawater.

== I ==
ichnology
The study of traces of organismal behavior.
idiomorphic
Bounded by the crystal faces peculiar to the species, used of minerals. Synonymous with euhedral.
igneous rock
A type of rock formed by solidification of cooled magma (molten rock), with or without crystallization, either below the surface as intrusive (plutonic) rocks or on the surface as extrusive (volcanic) rocks.
ignimbrite
Fine-grained to aphanitic, buff to dark brown compact rock with parallel streaks or lenticles of black glass, produced by violently explosive volcanoes.
ilmenite
An oxide of iron and titanium, crystallising in the trigonal system; a widespread accessory mineral in igneous rocks, especially those of basic composition.
illite
Non-swelling clay mineral with a three layers 2:1 (TOT) structure. Its interlayers contain no water and anhydrous K^{+} cations responsible for their total collapse. Water and cations diffusion is not possible in these collapsed interlayers. The name "illite" is inherited from the state of Illinois where natural non-swelling clay deposits exist.
indurated
Made hard (by heat or compaction).
interbedded
beds (layers) of rock lying between or alternating with beds of a different kind of rock.
intrusion
body of igneous rock that has crystallized from molten magma below the surface of the Earth.
island arc
A chain of volcanic islands or mountains formed by plate tectonics as an oceanic tectonic plate subducts under another tectonic plate and produces magma.
isomorphic
Two crystals that have similar shapes and sizes, usually through the angles.
isotope
different forms of an element each having different atomic mass (mass number).

== J ==
joint
A discrete discontinuity surface without evidence of displacement. See also diaclase or bedding.
Jurassic
A major unit of the geologic timescale that extended from about 199.6 ± 0.6 Ma (million years ago) to 145.4 ± 4.0 Ma, between the end of the Triassic and the beginning of the Cretaceous.

== K ==
Ka
A non-standard but widely used abbreviation for one thousand (1,000) years, using the metric prefix K (for "Kilo") to indicate a quantity of one thousand. When not otherwise qualified, it usually indicates 1,000 years Before Present (or 1,000 years ago).
kame
An irregularly shaped hill or mound composed of sand, gravel and till that accumulates in a depression on a retreating glacier and is then deposited on the land surface with further melting of the glacier.
kaolinite
A finely crystalline form of hydrated aluminium silicate occurring as minute monoclinic flaky crystals with a perfect basal cleavage, resulting mainly from the alteration of feldspars under conditions of hydrothermal or pneumatolytic metamorphism.
karst
A distinct type of landscape shaped by the dissolution of a layer or layers of soluble bedrock, usually carbonate rock such as limestone or dolomite. Karst topography is usually characterised by closed depressions or sinkholes, caves and underground drainage.
kettle
A fluvioglacial landform occurring as the result of blocks of ice calving from the front of a receding glacier and becoming partially to wholly buried by glacial outwash.
kink
A tight curl, twist, or bend in a rock band. See also folding and buckling.
kink band
An asymmetric, linear zone of deformation characterised by a tight curled, twisted, or bended rock band. Kink bands may also occur as conjugated sets.
kyanite
A silicate of aluminium which crystallises in the triclinic system. It usually occurs as long-bladed crystals, blue in colour, in metamorphic rocks.

== L ==
lacuna
A time-stratigraphic unit representing the gap in the stratigraphic record. Specifically the missing interval at an unconformity, representing the interpreted space-time value of both hiatus (period of non-deposition), and degradation vacuity (period of erosion).
lamprophyre
Igneous rocks usually occurring as dykes intimately related to larger intrusive bodies; characterised by abnormally high contents of coloured silicates, such as biotite, hornblende and augite, and a correspondingly small amount of feldspar, some being feldspar-free.
large igneous province
Massive volcanic formation resulting from flood basalt eruptions.
lava
Molten rock expelled by a volcano during an eruption.
leucocratic
A term used to denote a light colour in igneous rocks, due to a high content of felsic minerals and a correspondingly small amount of dark, heavy silicates.
limestone
A sedimentary rock composed largely of the mineral calcite (calcium carbonate: CaCO_{3}).
liquefaction
Soil liquefaction describes the behavior of soils that, when loaded, suddenly suffer a transition from a solid state to a liquefied state, or having the consistency of a heavy liquid.
lithic fragment

A sand-sized grain that is made up of smaller than sand-sized grains, e.g. a shale fragment or basalt fragment in a sandstone.
lithification
The process by which sediments compact under pressure, expel connate fluids, and gradually become solid rock.
lithology
A description of the physical characteristics of a rock unit visible at outcrop, in hand or core samples or with low magnification microscopy, such as colour, texture, grain size, or composition.
lithosphere
The rigid, outermost rocky shell of a terrestrial planet or natural satellite. The Earth's lithosphere is composed of the crust and the portion of the upper mantle that behaves elastically on time scales of up to thousands of years or more.
lithotype
Specific types of rock classified according to the standards of lithology.
loess
A fine, silty, pale yellow or buff-coloured, windblown (eolian) type of unconsolidated deposit.
lustre

== M ==
Ma
A non-standard but widely used abbreviation for one million (1,000,000) years, using the metric prefix M (for "Mega") to indicate a quantity of one million. When not otherwise qualified, it usually indicates 1,000,000 years Before Present (or 1,000,000 years ago).
mafic
A silicate mineral or rock that is rich in magnesium and iron. A mnemonic term for the ferromagnesian and other non-felsic minerals actually present in an igneous rock rich in dark (ferromagnesian) minerals (greater than 60% by volume). Basic [alkali gabbro (alkali basalt), syeno-gabbro (trachybasalt), gabbro (basalt and dolerite)].
magma
Molten rock that sometimes forms beneath the surface of the Earth (or other terrestrial planets) and often collects in a magma chamber.
magnetite
An oxide of iron which crystallises in the cubic system. It is attracted by a magnet but does not attract iron itself.
Malmesbury group
An 830 to 980 million-year-old basal group of the Western Cape comprising at least eight distinct formations, including the Tygerberg, Piketberg, Porterville, Berg river, Klipplaat, Moorreesburg, Franschhoek, and Bridgetown formations.
mantle
The highly viscous layer of molten rock situated directly beneath the Earth's crust and above the outer core.
marble
A fine to coarse-grained granoblastic calcium carbonate that effervesces in dilute hydrochloric acid. Often banded with various colours and sometimes veined.
marine terrace
A narrow, flat area often seen at the base of a sea cliff caused by the action of the waves.
marl
A calcium carbonate or lime-rich mud or mudstone which contains variable amounts of clays and aragonite.
massive
A description applied to a homogeneous rock which lacks internal structure or layers.
mélange
Large-scale breccia formed in the accretionary wedge above a subduction zone.
melanocratic
A term applied to rocks which are abnormally rich in dark and heavy ferro-magnesium minerals.
mesocratic
A term applied to igneous rocks which in respect of their content of dark silicates are intermediate between those of leucocratic and melanocratic type, and contain 30–60% of dark heavy minerals.
Mesozoic
The era of geological time including the Triassic, Jurassic, and Cretaceous ages.
metamorphic rock
metamorphism
The solid-state recrystallisation of pre-existing rocks due to changes in heat, pressure, or water-rock interactions, i.e. without melting.
metapelite
A metamorphosed pelite (fine grain, clayey) rock.
metasilicate
A salt of the non-existing metasilicic acid H_{2}SiO_{3} based on an analogy with the carbonate system.
metatexis
Low-grade anatexis: partial or differential melting of rock components with a low melting point.
mica
Any of a set of minerals which crystallise in the monoclinic system. They have similar chemical compositions and highly perfect basal cleavage.
micropaleontology
A branch of paleontology which studies microfossils.
mid-oceanic ridge
An underwater mountain range typically having a valley known as a rift running along its axis, formed by plate tectonics.
migmatite
A composite rock composed of igneous or igneous-looking and/or metamorphic materials which are generally distinguishable megascopically.
mineral
mineralization
The hydrothermal deposition of economically important metals in the formation of ore bodies or "lodes".
mineralogy
miogeosyncline
A geosyncline in which volcanism is not associated with sedimentation, or the non-volcanic part of the orthogeosyncline located near the craton.
Mohs scale of mineral hardness

molasse
A partly marine, partly continental or deltaic sedimentary facies consisting of a very thick sequence of soft ungraded cross-bedded fossiliferous conglomerates, sandstones, shales, and marls.
molding
The process of manufacturing by shaping pliable raw material using a rigid frame or model called a mold.
montmorillonite
Swelling clay mineral with a three layer 2:1 (TOT) structure whose interlayers are mainly occupied by hydrated Na^{+} and Ca^{2+} cations and water molecules. The name comes from Montmorillon, France. Montmorillonite and smectite are two interchangeable synonyms, the first being preferentially used in the US while the second one is more frequent in the literature from UK and Europe. See also bentonite.
monocline
A fold with a single limb which produces a sudden steepening of the dip; the rocks, however, soon approximate to horizontal on either side of this flexure.
monoclinic
Having three crystal axes of unequal lengths, with one intersection oblique and the other two perpendicular.
moraine
A glacially formed accumulation of unconsolidated debris which can occur in currently glaciated and formerly glaciated regions, such as those areas acted upon by a past ice age.
mullion
A particular type of reworked boudin. The term is likely derived from an architectural structure with the same name.
muscovite
The common or white mica; for the most part an orthosilicate of aluminium and potassium that crystallises in the monoclinic system.

== N ==
Namibian age
900 to 542 Ma (Neoproterozoic).
Neogene
A geologic period starting 23 million years ago and, depending on definition, either lasting until today or ending 2.6 million years ago with the beginning of the Quaternary.
nodule
A small, irregularly rounded lump or mass of a mineral or mineral aggregate with a contrasting composition to the enclosing sediment or rock. Not to be confused with concretion.
non-clastic
Having the properties of any chemically and/or organically deposited rock, such as limestones, chalks, and evaporite deposits.
normal fault

Dip-slip faults can be sub-classified into the types "reverse" and "normal". A normal fault occurs when the crust is extended such that the hanging wall moves downward relative to the footwall. Contrast reverse fault.

== O ==
obsidian
oligoclase
One of the plagioclase feldspars consisting of the albite and anorthite molecules combined in the proportions 9:1 to 7:3. It is found especially in the more acid igneous rocks.
olivine
An orthosilicate mineral of iron and magnesium which crystallises in the orthorhombic system and occurs widely in the basic and ultramafic igneous rocks. It includes olivine-gabbro, olivine–dolerite, olivine-basalt, and peridotites, among others.
Ordovician
A geologic period and system, the second of six of the Paleozoic Era, spanning the time between 485.4 ± 1.9 to 443.4 ± 1.5 million years ago. It follows the Cambrian and is followed by the Silurian.
orogenesis
The formation and growth of mountains related to tectonic activity.
orogeny
Any set of forces and events leading to a large structural deformation of the Earth's lithosphere due to the engagement of tectonic plates. It is the primary mechanism by which mountains are built on continents.
orthoclase
A silicate of potassium and aluminium which crystallises in the monoclinic system and occurs as an essential constituent in granitic and syenitic rocks and as an accessory in many other rock types.
orthogeosyncline
A geosyncline between continental and oceanic cratons containing both volcanic and non-volcanic belts.
orthorhombic
Having a crystal structure with three perpendicular axes all of different lengths.
orthosilicate
An obsolete classification based on the totally deprotonated tetrahedral SiO^{4−}_{4} anion of the monomeric orthosilicic acid, H_{4}SiO_{4}, or Si(OH)_{4}. Compare with the hypothetical and non-existing planar trigonal metasilicate SiO^{2−}_{3} anion imagined from the analogy to the carbonate, CO^{2−}_{3}, anion.
oxbow lake
A crescent-shaped lake found within a floodplain or fluvial terrace created by the cut-off and abandonment of an active meander within a river or stream channel.

== P ==
pahoehoe
A type of vesicular, basaltic lava often with a ropy surface texture.
Palaeozoic

The earliest of the three geologic eras of the Phanerozoic Eon, spanning the time from roughly 541 to 252.2 million years ago. It is the longest of the Phanerozoic eras and is subdivided into six geologic periods: the Cambrian, Ordovician, Silurian, Devonian, Carboniferous, and Permian. The Paleozoic Era follows the Neoproterozoic Era of the Proterozoic Eon, and is followed by the Mesozoic Era.
paleocurrent
An indication of the direction of fluid flow (at the time of deposition) visible in a rock.
paleontology
The scientific study of the biological life of the past, primarily through the study of fossils.
palagonite
An alteration product from the interaction of water with volcanic glass of chemical composition similar to basalt or from the interaction between water and basalt melt.
paralithic
A weathered layer of bedrock.
pegmatite
An exceptionally coarse-grained igneous rock.
pelite
A descriptive name for a clastic rock with a grain size of less than 1/16 mm (originally sand or silt).
peridotite
An olive green when fresh, medium brown when weathered, saccharoidal intrusive igneous rock composed mainly of olivine, sometimes with pyroxene.
petrology
The branch of geology that studies the origin, composition, distribution, and structure of rocks.
phenoclast
A large, conspicuous fragment in sediment or sedimentary rock composed of various sizes of material.
phenocryst
A relatively large crystal in an igneous rock.
phyllite
Any of a set of argillaceous rocks in a condition of metamorphism between slate and mica-schist.
phyllonite
A rock that macroscopically resembles phyllite but that is formed by mechanical degradation (mylonization) of initially coarser rocks (e.g., graywacke, granite, or gneiss).
piercing point
A feature that is cut by a fault and moved. Reconstruction of that object can show how much the fault has moved.
pillar
A vertical, standing, often spire-shaped, natural rock formation.
pitchstone
A black, opaque volcanic glass that may contain irregular, whitish clusters of minerals. Resembles pitch in appearance.
plate tectonics
The set of natural processes and phenomena which result in large-scale movements of portions of the Earth's lithosphere, which is fragmented into multiple tectonic plates of various sizes.
Pleistocene
The geologic epoch which lasted from about 2,588,000 to 11,700 years ago, spanning the world's recent period of repeated glaciations. The Pleistocene is the first epoch of the Quaternary Period and the sixth epoch of the Cenozoic Era.
Pliocene
The geologic period that extends from 5.332 million to 2.588[2] million years Before Present. It is the second-youngest epoch of the Neogene Period in the Cenozoic Era. The Pliocene follows the Miocene and is followed by the Pleistocene.
pluton
plutonic
Having crystallised at depth within the Earth's crust, used of a rock. Plutonic rocks are slow-cooling and coarse-grained and have relatively low temperatures of final consolidation.
plumose structure
A ladder or grid pattern that occurs during jointing that resembles plumes, oriented perpendicular to the stress, hence which usually form parallel to the upper and lower surfaces of the constituent rock unit.
pneumatolysis
The destructive after-action of the concentrated volatile constituents of a magma, effected after the consolidation of the main body of the magma.
polymictic
polysynthetic twinning
pore water
Water present in rock and soil pore spaces. Also called interstitial water.
porphyroblast
A large mineral crystal in a metamorphic rock which has grown within the finer-grained groundmass.
porphyry
1. A rock that is porphyritic, containing large and small crystals.
2. In mining, a specific deposit containing widely disseminated metals, typically copper.
Precambrian
A non-standard geologic time period immediately preceding the Phanerozoic Eon, divided into several eons of the geologic time scale. It spans from the formation of Earth about 4540 Ma (million years ago) to the beginning of the Cambrian Period, about 541.0 ± 1.0 Ma, when macroscopic hard-shelled animals first appeared in abundance.
precipitate
A rock or mineral precipitated into solid form from an aqueous solution.
pressure solution
Rock deformation mechanism involving minerals dissolution under mechanical stress.
prograde metamorphism
Mineral changes in rocks under increasing pressure and/or temperature conditions.
protolith
The source rock from which a metamorphic, or in some rare cases a sedimentary, rock was formed. In most cases the appropriate sedimentary term is "provenance" rather than "protolith", since the material has been transported.
psammite
A general term for a sandstone, most often used to describe a metamorphosed rock unit with a dominantly sandstone protolith.
pseudomatrix
A weaker material (mainly lithic fragments) that becomes crushed and matrix-like in a rock.
pumice
A light-coloured, highly vesicular volcanic rock of very low density.
pyroclastic flow
A fast-moving current of hot gas and rock (collectively known as tephra), which normally hugs the ground and travels downhill or spreads laterally under gravity.
pyroclastic
A volcanic fragment, such as a volcanic bomb, breadcrust bomb, or achnelith.
pyroxene
Any of a set of mineral species which, although falling into different systems (orthorhombic, monoclinic, and triclinic), are closely related in form and structure. They are metasilicates of calcium, magnesium, and iron with manganese, and less often with sodium, potassium, zirconium, and fluorine.
pyroxenite
A coarse-grained, holocrystalline igneous rock consisting mainly of pyroxenes. It may contain biotite, hornblende, or olivine as accessories.

== Q ==
quartz
quartzite
A compact, hard, very fine-grained white to creamy white rock which breaks into sharp angular fragments. Quartzite is always associated with other metamorphic rocks, while cemented sandstone is always associated with other sedimentary rocks.
Quaternary
The most recent of the three periods of the Cenozoic Era in the standard geologic time scale. It follows the Neogene Period, spanning 2.588 ± 0.005 million years ago to the present.

== R ==
reef knoll
Landform comprising an immense pile of calcareous material previously accumulated on an ancient sea floor. Reef knolls can be divided into bioherms and biostromes. A bioherm is a landform of organic sedimentary rock enclosed or surrounded by rock of different origins. A biostrome is a distinctly bedded or broadly lenticular sedimentary rock landform.
regional metamorphism
Over wide areas resulting from deep burial with consequent rise in temperature and static pressure, usually with the help of folding movements that accompany the formation of mountain ranges.
reticulite
A basaltic pumice in which the walls of the vesicles have collapsed, leaving a network of fine, interconnecting glass threads. It is the lightest rock known.
retrograde metamorphism
The reconstitution of a rock via revolatisation under decreasing temperatures (and usually pressures), allowing the mineral assemblages formed in prograde metamorphism to revert to those more stable at less extreme conditions.
reverse fault

Dip-slip faults can be sub-classified into the types "reverse" and "normal". A reverse fault occurs when the crust is compressed such that the hanging wall moves upward relative to the footwall. Contrast normal fault.
rhyolite
An aphanitic, buff to greyish flow-banded rock, often containing spherulites or phenocrysts of quartz and feldspar.
rift
roche moutonnée
An elongated post-glacial rock formation with a smoothed surface on the uphill side and a "plucked" surface on the downhill side.
rock
rolling hills
undulating low hill terrain; cf. "Hügelland"
rudaceous
Having the composition and characteristics of clastic rocks, i.e. coarse-grained sedimentary rocks, conglomerates, and breccias, with a particle size of less than 2 mm.
rudite
A generic term for any of a set of sedimentary rocks composed of rounded or angular detrital grains, i.e. granules, pebbles, cobbles, and boulders, which are coarser than sand in size.

== S ==
saccharoidal
Having a texture similar to that of granulated sugar.
Saldanian orogeny
sand
sandstone
Sand (with grains up to 2 mm in diameter) in which the grains are cemented together by secondary silica or calcite. Sandstone may be loosely cemented and soft or well cemented and hard, and is usually buff to brownish in color, sometimes reddish, due to the presence of iron oxides, or greenish, due to the presence of glauconite.
sanidine
A form of potash feldspar identical in composition with orthoclase but physically different, formed under different conditions and occurring in different rock types. It is the high temperature form of orthoclase, into which it inverts at 900 °C (1,650 °F). Occurs in lavas and dyke rocks.
schist
A group of medium-grade metamorphic rocks, chiefly notable for the preponderance of lamellar minerals such as micas, chlorite, talc, hornblende, graphite, and others. In French, schist is understood as shale.
scree
See talus.
sediment trap
A depression in which sediments substantially accumulate over time.
sedimentary rock
sequence
A sequence of geological events, processes, or rocks arranged in chronological order.
sericite
A white potash-mica, similar to muscovite in chemical composition and general character but occurring as a secondary mineral, often as a decomposition product of orthoclase.
shale
A fine-grained, clastic sedimentary rock composed of mud that is a mix of flakes of clay minerals and tiny fragments (silt-sized particles) of other minerals, especially quartz and calcite.
shear zone
A tabular to sheet-like, planar or curviplanar zone composed of rocks that are more highly strained than rocks adjacent to the zone. See also fault.
shield
A large area of exposed Precambrian crystalline igneous and high-grade metamorphic rocks that form tectonically stable areas.
shingle beach
A beach which is armoured with pebbles or small- to medium-sized cobbles (as opposed to fine sand), typically ranging from 2 to 200 millimetres (0.1 to 7.9 in) diameter.
silcrete
An indurated soil duricrust formed when surface sand and gravel are cemented by dissolved silica.
silt
Granular material of a size somewhere between sand and clay whose mineral origin is quartz and feldspar. Silt may occur as a soil or as suspended sediment (also known as suspended load) in a surface water body. It may also exist as soil deposited at the bottom of a water body.
siltstone
Indurated silt whose granulometry is somewhere between that of sand and clay.
slate
Very fine-grained sedimentary rock of the clay or silt grade which as a consequence of regional metamorphism has developed a slaty cleavage.
slaty cleavage
The property of splitting easily along regular, closely spaced planes of fissility, produced by pressure in fine-grained rocks, with the cleavage planes lying in the directions of maximum elongation of the mass.
slickenside
A smoothly polished surface caused by frictional movement between rocks along the two sides of a fault. This surface is normally striated in the direction of movement.
slump
A form of mass wasting that occurs when a coherent mass of loosely consolidated materials or rock layers moves a short distance down a slope.
snowball Earth
Series of global glaciations in the Precambrian, 600 to 700 million years ago, before the hard-shelled animal life explosion.
smectite
Swelling clay minerals with a three-layer 2:1 (TOT) structure whose interlayers are mainly occupied by Na^{+} or Ca^{2+} hydrated cations and water molecules (from Ancient Greek σμηκτός (smēktós) 'lubricated'; from σμηκτρίς (smēktrís) 'walker's earth, fuller's earth'; lit. 'rubbing earth; earth that has the property of cleaning'). See also montmorillonite and bentonite. For non-swelling 2:1 clay minerals, see illite and chlorite.
soil liquefaction
The process describing the behavior of soils that, when loaded, suddenly suffer a transition from a solid state to a liquefied state, or which have the consistency of a heavy liquid.
sorting
Sorting describes the distribution of grain size of sediments, either in unconsolidated deposits or in sedimentary rocks. Very poorly sorted indicates that the sediment sizes are mixed (large variance); whereas well sorted indicates that the sediment sizes are similar (low variance).
speleothem
A geological formation by mineral deposits that accumulate over time in natural caves. Speleothems most commonly form in calcareous caves due to carbonate dissolution reactions. They can take a variety of forms, depending on their depositional history and environment. Their chemical composition, gradual growth, and preservation in caves make them useful paleoclimatic proxies. Includes stalactites and stalagmites.
sphene
Ancient deprecated name for a calcium titanium nesosilicate mineral, CaTiSiO_{5}.

staurolite
A red brown to black, mostly opaque, nesosilicate mineral with a white streak.
stone
storm ridge
A beach ridge usually located further or higher inland caused by wave action from storms.
strain
A change in the volume or shape of a rock mass in response to stress.
stratigraphy
stratum
stylolite
An irregular discontinuity or non-structural fracture in limestone and other sedimentary rocks. Stylolites result from compaction and pressure solution during diagenesis.
surficial
Of or pertaining to the surface.
syenite
A coarse-grained igneous rock of intermediate composition, composed essentially of alkali-feldspar to the extent of at least two thirds of the total, with a variable content of mafic materials, of which common hornblende is characteristic.
syncline
A geological fold with strata dipping inwards towards the fold axis. Contrast anticline.
syntaxis
An abrupt change in the orientation of a mountain belt or individual fold/thrust structure

== T ==
Table Mountain Group
A group of rock formations within the Cape Supergroup sequence of rocks.
talus

A collection of broken rock fragments at the base of crags, mountain cliffs, volcanoes or valley shoulders that has accumulated through periodic rockfall from adjacent cliff faces. Landforms associated with these materials are often called talus deposits.
tectonic plate
tektite
Natural glass formed from terrestrial ejecta during a meteorite impact.
tempestite
Storm deposits found in sedimentary formations where shell debris accumulate under the effect of waves and seawater movement.
tenacity
A mineral's behavior when deformed or broken.
tephra
Fragmental material produced by a volcanic eruption regardless of composition, fragment size or emplacement mechanism. Once clasts have fallen to the ground they remain as tephra unless hot enough to fuse together into pyroclastic rock or tuff.
Tethys Ocean
A prehistoric ocean that existed between the continents of Gondwana and Laurasia during the Mesozoic era before the opening of the Indian Ocean.
till

Unsorted glacial sediment. Glacial drift is a general term for the coarsely graded and extremely heterogeneous sediments of glacial origin. Glacial till is that part of glacial drift which was deposited directly by the glacier.
tillite
A type of sedimentary rock derived from glacial till which has been indurated or lithified by subsequent burial into solid rock.
titanite
A calcium titanium nesosilicate mineral, CaTiSiO_{5}. See also sphene.
topography
The arrangement of the natural and artificial physical features of an area.
tor
A large, free-standing residual mass (rock outcrop) that rises abruptly from the surrounding smooth and gentle slopes of a rounded hill summit or ridge crest.
trace fossil
trachyte
A fine-grained igneous rock type of intermediate composition, in most cases with little or no quartz, consisting largely of alkali-feldspars (sanidene or oligooclase) together with a small amount of coloured silicates such as diopside, horneblende, or mica.
travertine
A terrestrial sedimentary rock formed by the precipitation of carbonate minerals from solution in ground and surface waters and/or geothermally heated hot springs.
triclinic
In the triclinic system, the crystal is described by vectors of unequal length, and none of the three vectors are orthogonal to another.
tuff
A rock formed of compacted volcanic fragments, some of which can be distinguished by the naked eye. If the fragments are larger than the rock grades into an agglomerate.
tundra
A vast, flat, treeless Arctic region of Europe, Asia, and North America in which the subsoil is permanently frozen.
turbidite
The deposit of a turbidity current.
turbidity current
A current of rapidly moving, sediment-laden water moving down a slope through water, or another fluid. The current moves because it has a higher density than the fluid through which it flows.
Tygerberg formation
A component of the PreCambrian Malmesbury group of South Africa

== U ==
ultramafic

Almost feldspar-free. Examples of ultramafic rocks include dunite, peridotite, and pyroxenite.
undulating hills
see "rolling hills"
Urgonian
A shallow-water carbonate facies deposited along the northern margins of the Tethys Ocean during the Barremian and Aptian.

== V ==
vacuole
A bubble inclusion within mineral grains (typically monocrystalline quartz), filled with liquid, gas, or both liquid and gas. Vacuoles are randomly distributed in contrast to the oriented bubble trains of Boehm Lamellae.
Variscan orogeny

A geologic mountain-building event caused by Late Paleozoic continental collision between Euramerica (Laurussia) and Gondwana to form the supercontinent of Pangaea.
varve
An annual layer of sediment or sedimentary rock.
vein
A mineral filling of a fracture or other crack within a rock in a sheet-like or tabular shape.
vermiculite
A hydrous silicate mineral that is classified as a phyllosilicate and that expands greatly when heated. Exfoliation occurs when the mineral is heated sufficiently.
vergence
The direction of overturning of asymmetric folds, which matches the direction of thrusting.
vesiculated
vitrinite
A group of macerals that are the most common component of coal.
vitrophyre
See pitchstone.
volcanic
Rocks that have crystallised from magma poured out at the surface or introduced at shallow depth. They have cooled relatively rapidly, the grain size of the crystals is small, some part of the melt may solidify as glass, volatiles are lost and anhydrous minerals with high temperatures of crystallisation are present.
volcanic bomb
Rounded or spindle-shaped rock of mainly basaltic composition ejected during eruptions.
vug
A small cavity in a rock filled or lined with crystals or minerals that are different from the host rock.

== W ==
wiggle trace
A graph that plots wave amplitudes (recorded by seismic reflection and borehole logging) as a function of time, with the positive peaks shaded in a single dark colour.
wolframite
An iron manganese tungstate mineral with the chemical formula (Fe,Mn)WO_{4}.

== X ==
xenolith
A rock fragment which becomes enveloped in a larger rock during the latter's development and hardening. In geology, the term is almost exclusively used to describe inclusions in igneous rock during magma emplacement and eruption.
xenotime
A rare earth phosphate mineral whose major component is yttrium orthophosphate (YPO_{4}).
X-ray diffraction (XRD)
A method of determining the arrangement of atoms within a crystal, in which a beam of X-rays strikes a crystal and diffracts into many specific directions.
X-ray fluorescence (XRF)
The emission of characteristic "secondary" (or fluorescent) X-rays from a material that has been excited by bombarding with high-energy X-rays or gamma rays. The phenomenon is widely used for elemental analysis and chemical analysis of minerals.
xyloid coal

A soft brown fuel with characteristics that put it somewhere between coal and peat.

== Y ==
Yellowcake

A kind of uranium concentrate powder obtained from leach solutions in an intermediate step in the enrichment of uranium ores.
Young's modulus

In solid mechanics, a measure of the stiffness of an isotropic elastic material. It is defined as the ratio of the uniaxial stress over the uniaxial strain in the range of stress in which Hooke's law holds.
Ypresian
The oldest age or the lowest stratigraphic stage of the Eocene. It spans the time between ~56 Ma and ~49 Ma (million years ago).

== Z ==
zeolite
Microporous, aluminosilicate minerals commonly used as adsorbents.
zircon
A zirconium silicate mineral belonging to the group of nesosilicates. Its corresponding chemical formula is ZrSiO_{4}.

== See also ==
- Outline of geology
- Index of geology articles
- Glossary of geography terms
- Glossary of landforms
