= Lode =

Part of a rock body that holds ore

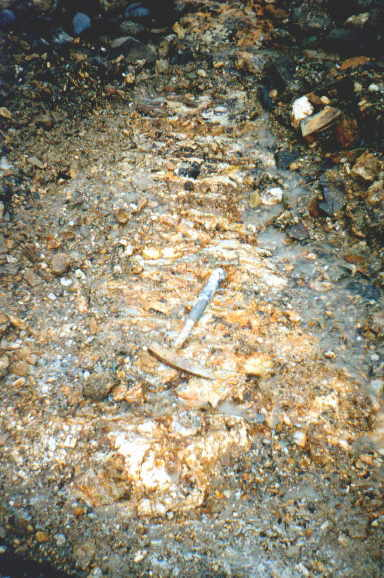
Gold-bearing quartz veins, Blue Ribbon Mine, Alaska

In geology, a lode is a deposit of metalliferous ore that fills or is embedded in a fracture (or crack) in a rock formation or a vein of ore that is deposited or embedded between layers of rock. The current meaning (ore vein) dates from the 17th century, being an expansion of an earlier sense of a "channel, watercourse" in Late Middle English, which in turn is from the 11th-century meaning of lode as a "course, way".

The generally accepted hydrothermal model of lode deposition posits that metals dissolved in hydrothermal solutions (hot spring fluids) deposit the gold or other metallic minerals inside the fissures in the pre-existing rocks. Lode deposits are distinguished primarily from placer deposits, where the ore has been eroded out from its original depositional environment and redeposited by sedimentation. A third process for ore deposition is as an evaporite.

A stringer lode is one in which the rock is so permeated by small veinlets that rather than mining the veins, the entire mass of ore and the enveined country rock is mined. It is so named because of the irregular branching of the veins into many anastomosis stringers, so that the ore is not separable from the country rock.

One of the largest silver lodes was the Comstock Lode in Nevada, although it is overshadowed by the more recently discovered Cannington Lode in Queensland, Australia. The largest gold lode in the United States was the Homestake Lode. The Broken Hill Lode in South Australia is the largest lead-zinc lode ever discovered.

== See also ==
- Binger Hermann
- General Mining Act of 1872
- Geographic information system
- Land patent
- Lodestone known just as lode in the 16th and 17th centuries.
- Mother lode, the principal vein
- Ore genesis
- Surveying
- Thickness (geology)
