= Steep structure =

Geological feature found in Northern Cape Province, South Africa

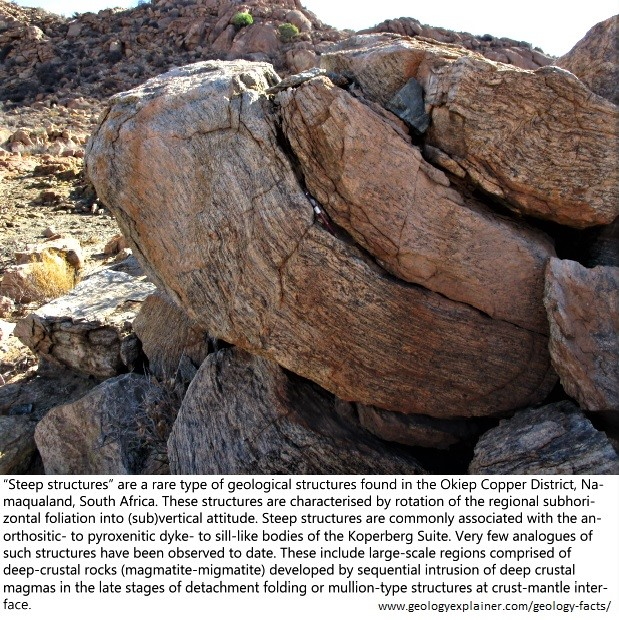
. A small-scale steep structure characterised by the rotation of the subhorizontal foliation of the Nababeep Granite Gneiss into subvertical attitude, Klondike, O'okiep Copper District, Namaqualand, South Africa. Pencil for scale.

A steep structure is a unique structural feature found in the O'okiep Copper District (OCD), Namaqualand, Northern Cape Province, South Africa. These structures occur as narrow, east-west trending, antiformal and/or monoclinal zones of high strain characterised by the rotation of regional foliation into subvertical attitude. These structures commonly host plug- and dyke-like mafic- to intermediate cupriferous bodies of the Koperberg Suite in their central portions. Steep structures are interpreted to have formed at the same time as the granulite-facies metamorphism during the waning stages of the Namaqua Orogeny. Steep structures are also intimately related to megabreccias, a term coined by geologists in the OCD for granite-gneiss and metasedimentary country rocks cemented by granitic material
