= Vein (geology) =

Sheetlike body of crystallized minerals within a rock

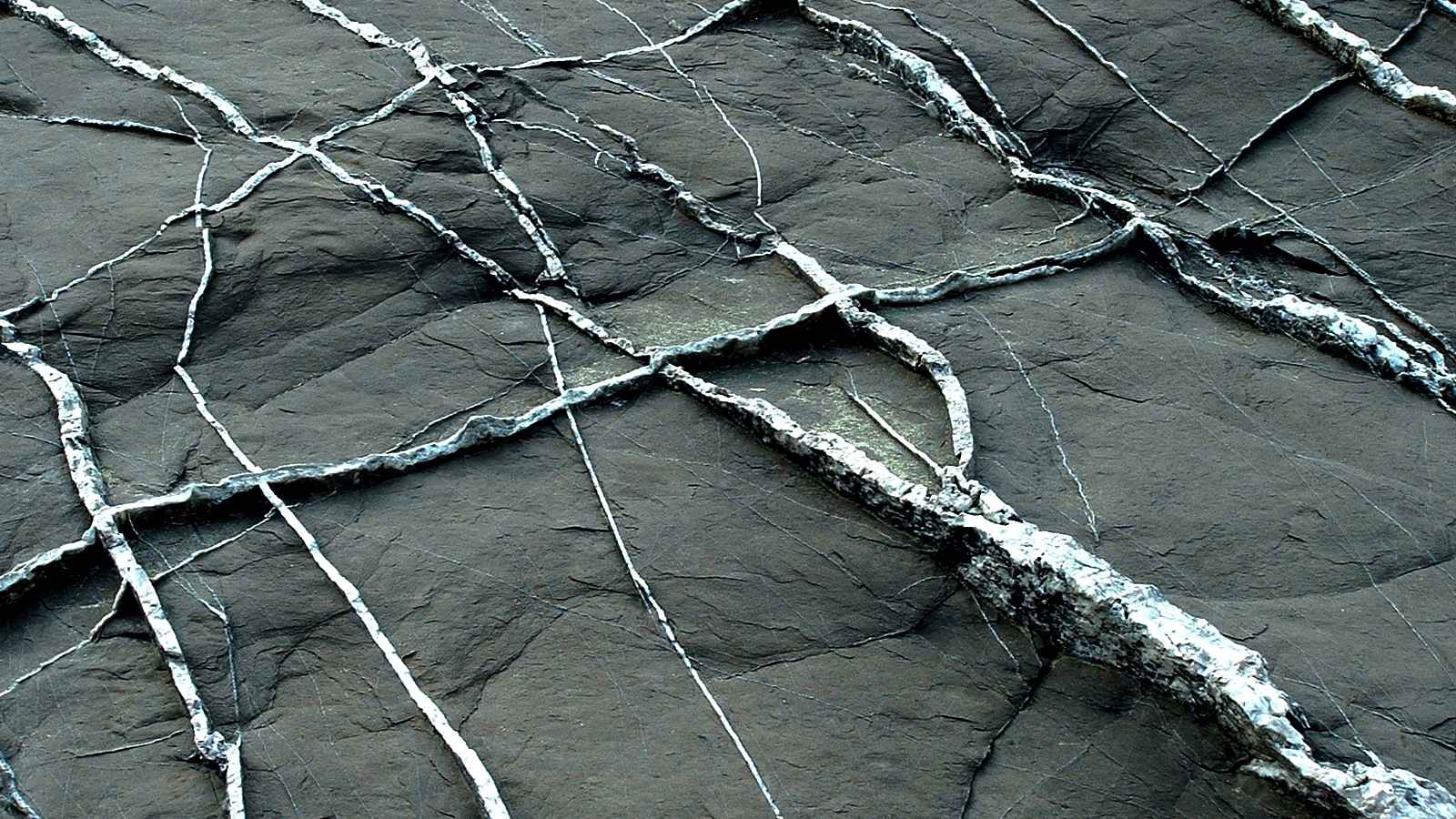
White veins in dark rock at Imperia, Italy

In geology, a vein is a distinct sheetlike body of crystallized minerals within a rock. Veins form when mineral constituents carried by an aqueous solution within the rock mass are deposited through precipitation. The hydraulic flow involved is usually due to hydrothermal circulation.

Veins are classically thought of as being planar fractures in rocks, with the crystal growth occurring normal to the walls of the cavity, and the crystal protruding into open space. This certainly is the method for the formation of some veins. However, it is rare in geology for significant open space to remain open in large volumes of rock, especially several kilometers below the surface. Thus, there are two main mechanisms considered likely for the formation of veins: open-space filling and crack-seal growth.

== Open space filling ==
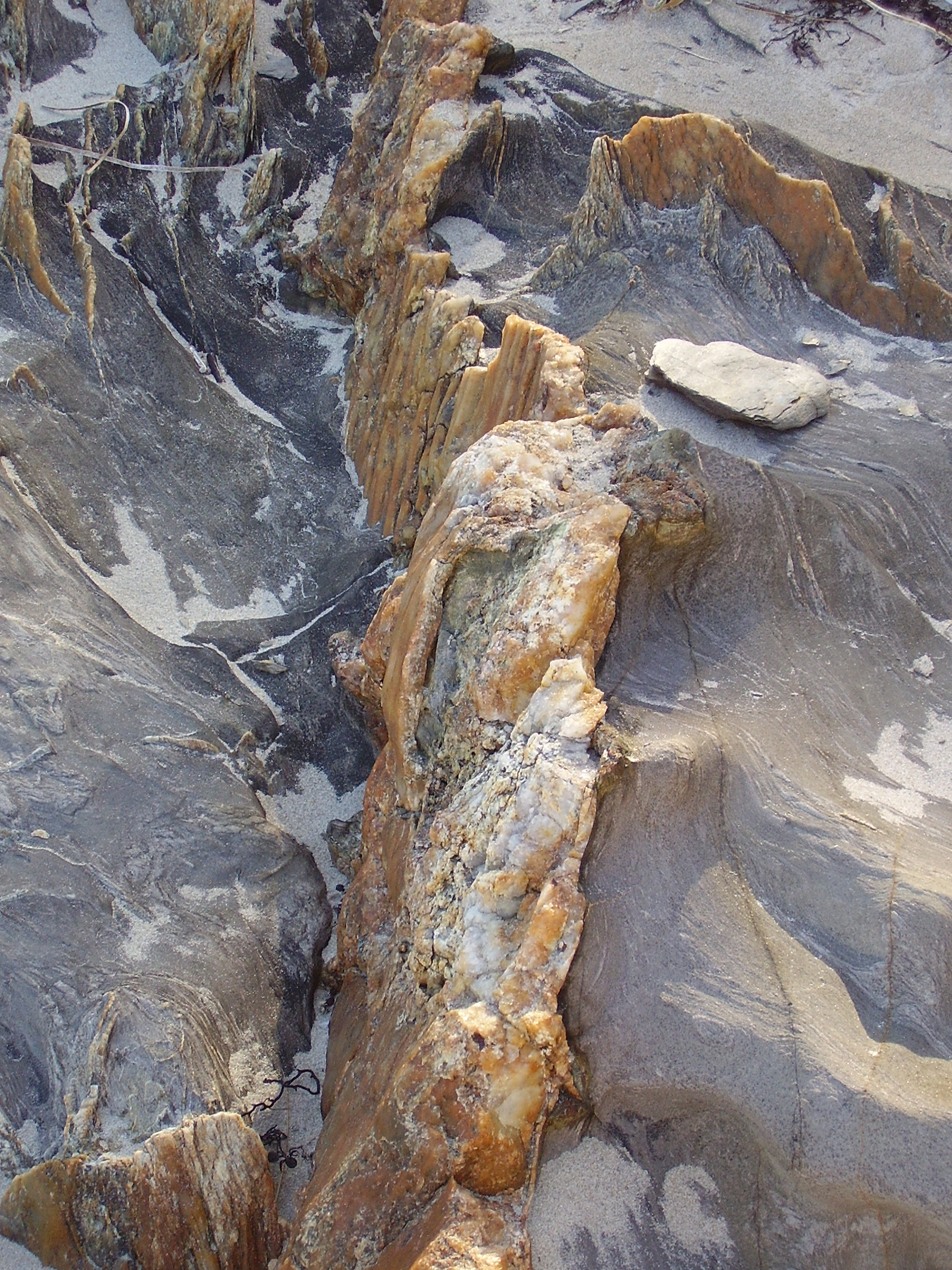
A quartz vein, prominent from the surrounding weathered rock at Cape Jervis, South Australia

Open space filling is the hallmark of epithermal vein systems, such as a stockwork, in greisens or in certain skarn environments. For open space filling to take effect, the confining pressure is generally considered to be below 0.5 GPa, or less than 3–5 km (2–3 mi). Veins formed in this way may exhibit a colloform, agate-like habit, of sequential selvages of minerals which radiate out from nucleation points on the vein walls and appear to fill up the available open space. Of tabular dipping sheets, diatremes or laterally extensive mantos controlled by boundaries such as thrust faults, competent sedimentary layers, or cap rocks.

== Crack-seal veins ==
Crack-seal veins form when rock is repeatedly fractured and filled with crystal growth. Although each crack-seal cycle may only add a thin layer to the vein, repeated fractures along the interface can result in veins of considerable thickness.

Crack-seal veins are thought to form quite quickly during deformation by precipitation of minerals within incipient fractures. This happens swiftly by geologic standards, because pressures and deformation mean that large open spaces cannot be maintained; Generally the space is in the order of millimeters or micrometers. Veins grow in thickness by reopening of the vein fracture and progressive deposition of minerals on the growth surface as well as being decomposable.

On the macroscopic scale, the formation of veins is controlled by fracture mechanics, providing the space for minerals to precipitate. Failure modes are classified as (1) shear fractures, (2) extensional fractures, and (3) hybrid fractures, and can be described by the Mohr-Griffith-Coulomb fracture criterion. The fracture criterion defines both the stress required for fracturing and the fracture orientation, as it is possible to construct on a Mohr diagram the shear fracture envelope that separates stable from unstable states of stress. The shear fracture envelope is approximated by a pair of lines that are symmetric across the σ_{n} axis. As soon as the Mohr circle touches the lines of the fracture envelope that represent a critical state of stress, a fracture will be generated. The point of the circle that first touches the envelope represents the plane along which a fracture forms. A newly formed fracture leads to changes in the stress field and tensile strength of the fractured rock and causes a drop in stress magnitude. If a stress increases again, a new fracture will most likely be generated along the same fracture plane. This process is known as the crack-seal mechanism.

== Tectonic implications ==
Veins generally need either hydraulic pressure in excess of hydrostatic pressure (to form hydraulic fractures or hydrofracture breccias) or they need open spaces or fractures, which requires a plane of extension within the rock mass.

In all cases except brecciation, therefore, a vein measures the plane of extension within the rock mass, give or take a sizeable bit of error. Measurement of enough veins will statistically form a plane of principal extension.

In ductilely deforming compressional regimes, this can in turn give information on the stresses active at the time of vein formation. In extensionally deforming regimes, the veins occur roughly normal to the axis of extension.

== Mineralization and veining ==
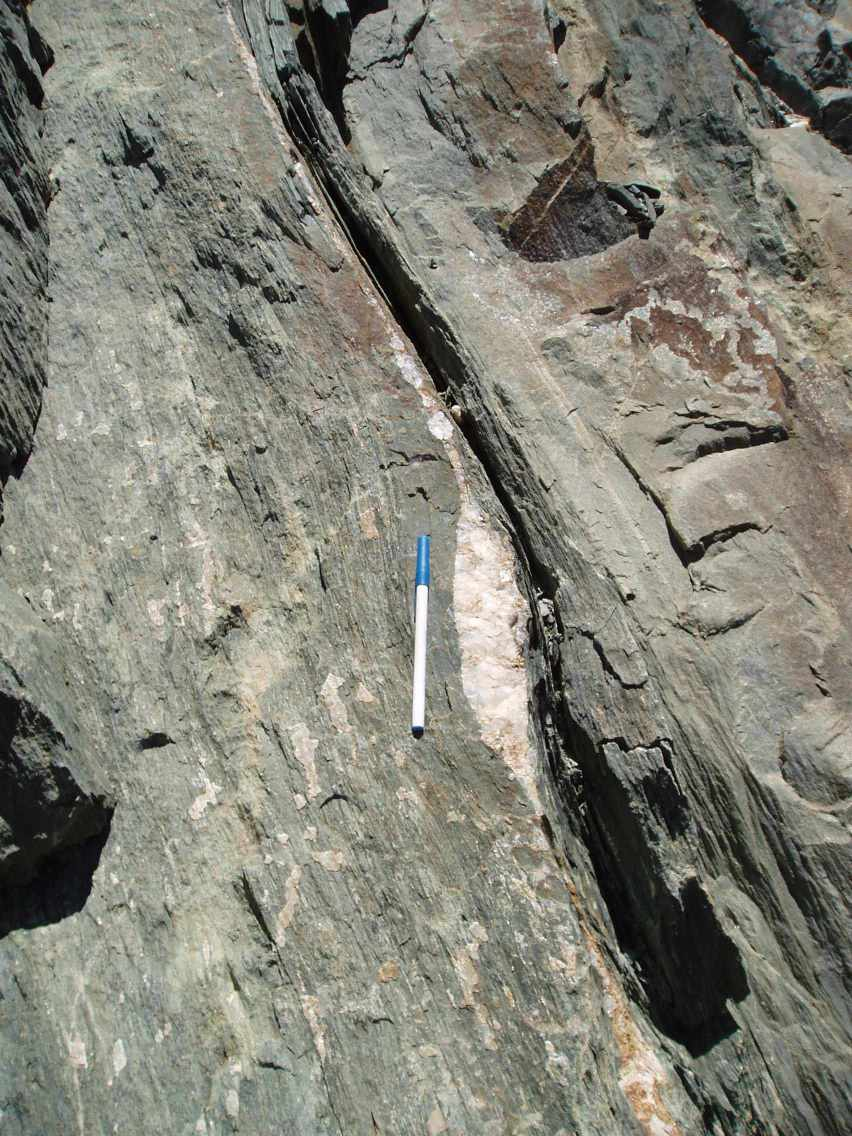
Boudinaged quartz vein (with strain fringe) showing dextral shear sense. Starlight Pit, Fortnum Gold Mine, Western Australia.

Veins are common features in rocks and are evidence of fluid flow in fracture systems. Veins provide information on stress, strain, pressure, temperature, fluid origin and fluid composition during their formation. Typical examples include gold lodes, as well as skarn mineralisation. Hydrofracture breccias are classic targets for ore exploration as there is plenty of fluid flow and open space to deposit ore minerals.

Ores related to hydrothermal mineralisation, which are associated with vein material, may be composed of vein material and/or the rock in which the vein is hosted.

=== Gold-bearing veins ===
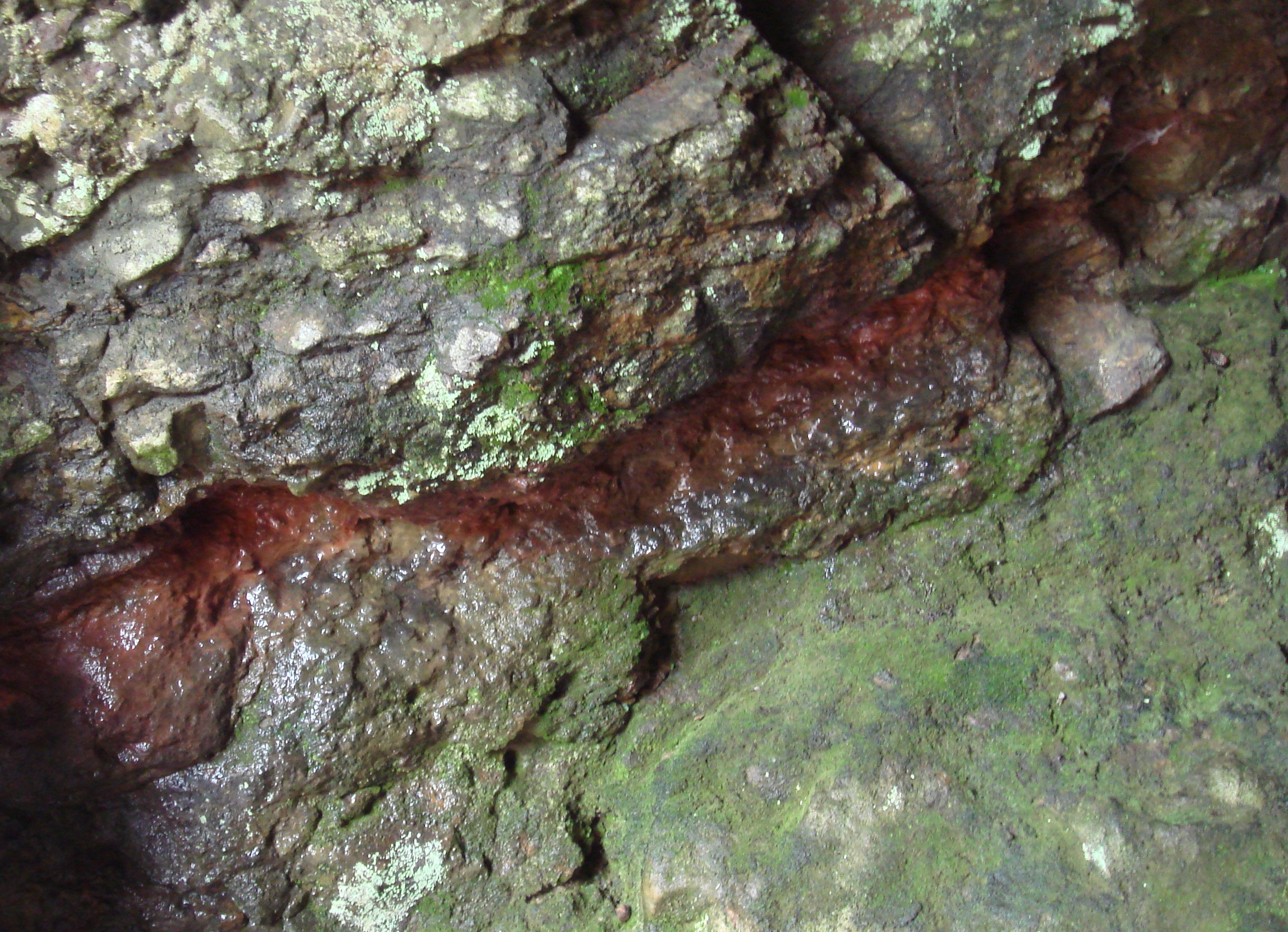
In situ gold-bearing vein (in brown) at the Toi gold mine, Japan.

In many gold mines exploited during the gold rushes of the 19th century, vein material alone was typically sought as ore material. In most of today's mines, ore material is primarily composed of the veins and some component of the wall rocks which surrounds the veins.

The difference between 19th-century and 21st-century mining techniques and the type of ore sought is based on the grade of material being mined and the methods of mining which are used. Historically, hand-mining of gold ores permitted the miners to pick out the lode quartz or reef quartz, allowing the highest-grade portions of the lodes to be worked, without dilution from the unmineralised wall rocks.

Today's mining, which uses larger machinery and equipment, forces the miners to take low-grade waste rock in with the ore material, resulting in dilution of the grade.

However, today's mining and assaying allows the delineation of lower-grade bulk tonnage mineralisation, within which the gold is invisible to the naked eye. In these cases, veining is the subordinate host to mineralisation and may only be an indicator of the presence of metasomatism of the wall-rocks which contains the low-grade mineralisation.

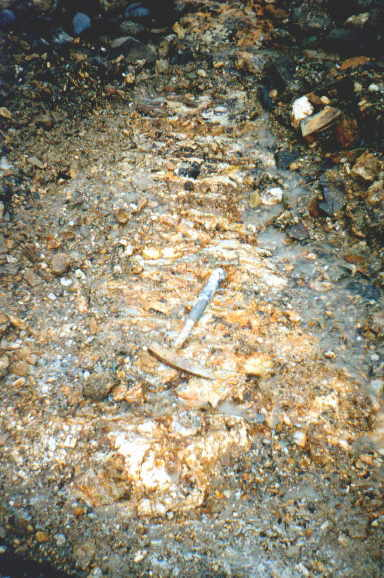
Gold-bearing quartz veins, Blue Ribbon Mine, Alaska

For this reason, veins within hydrothermal gold deposits are no longer the exclusive target of mining, and in some cases gold mineralisation is restricted entirely to the altered wall rocks within which entirely barren quartz veins are hosted.

== See also ==
- Boudinage
- Ore genesis
- Shear (geology)
