= Peters Creek, Alaska =

The place name Peters Creek in the U.S. state of Alaska may refer to:

- A major portion of Chugiak, Anchorage, a collection of neighborhoods and historically separate community in the Municipality of Anchorage
- An alternate name for Petersville, Alaska, a census-designated place in the Matanuska-Susitna Borough
