= Placer deposit =

Accumulation of valuable minerals formed by gravity separation

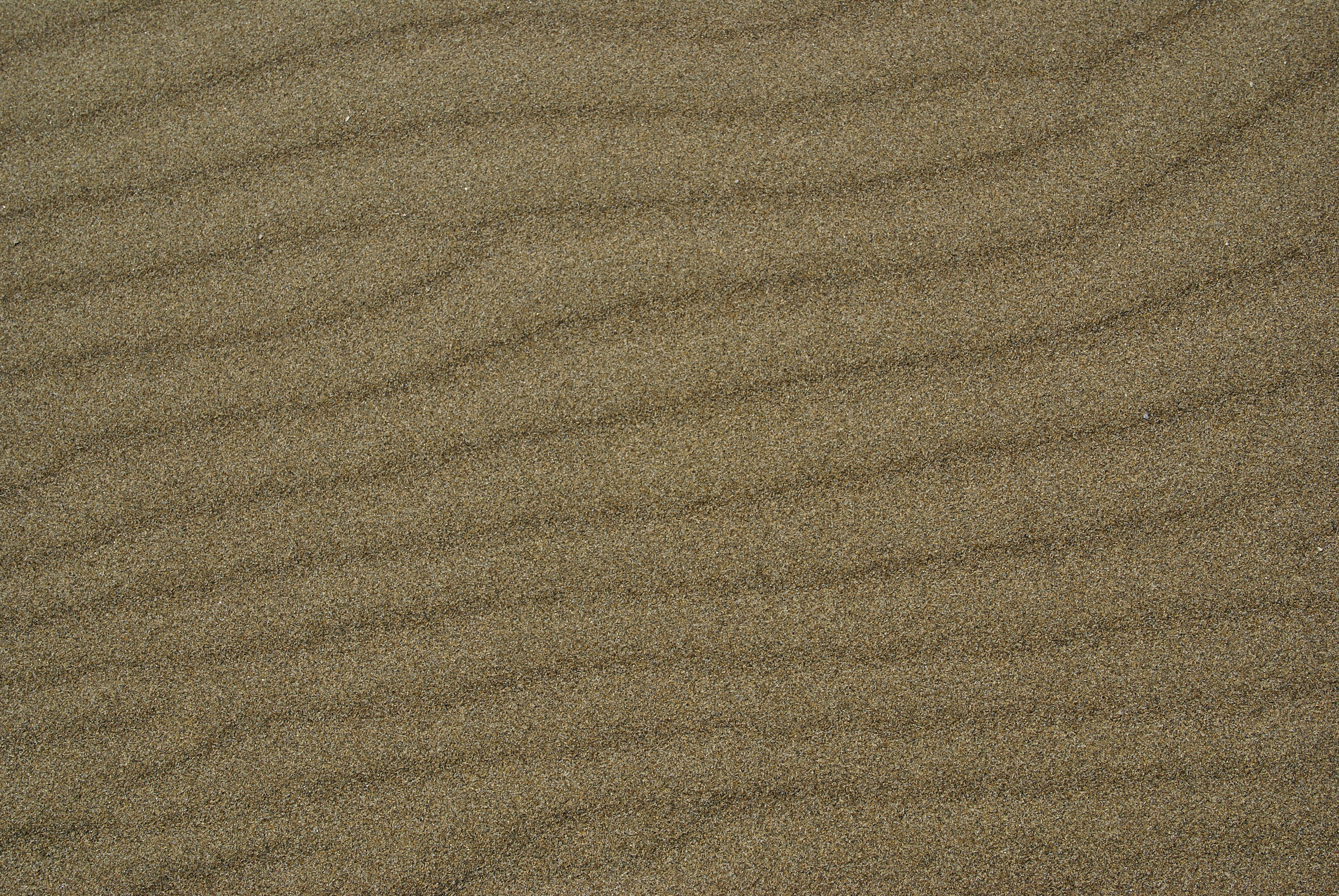
Heavy minerals (black) forming placers along ripple marks

In geology, a placer deposit or placer is an accumulation of valuable minerals formed by gravity separation from a specific source rock during sedimentary processes. The name is from the Spanish word placer, meaning "alluvial sand". Placer mining is an important source of gold, and was the main technique used in the early years of many gold rushes, including the California Gold Rush. Types of placer deposits include alluvium, eluvium, beach placers, aeolian placers and paleo-placers.

Placer materials must be both dense and resistant to weathering processes. To accumulate in placers, mineral particles must have a specific gravity above 2.58.

Placer environments typically contain black sand, a conspicuous shiny black mixture of iron oxides, mostly magnetite with variable amounts of ilmenite and hematite. Valuable mineral components often occurring with black sands are monazite, rutile, zircon, chromite, wolframite, and cassiterite. Early mining operations were probably a result of placer deposits as they were easily accessible and potential size. The events known as gold/diamond rushes were caused by placer deposits and have proved to be plentiful.

== Characteristics of placer minerals ==
=== Density ===
Placer minerals are defined as having a specific gravity above 2.58. The separation of the valuable minerals from the most common non-economic mineral, quartz, depends on the difference in specific gravity / density.The weathering process allows for the accumulation of placer minerals, while less dense materials such as quartz are swept away.

=== Hardness ===
Hardness allows placer minerals to resist mechanical breakdown and loss of mass from abrasion during transport. A hardness greater than quartz is desired, however substances such as gold typically deform and create irregularly shaped nuggets when subject to mechanical stress.

=== Stability ===
Chemical stability is important for a placer mineral to resist chemical breakdown such as oxidation, Minerals lacking chemical stability will form less desirable alteration when subject to chemical breakdown.

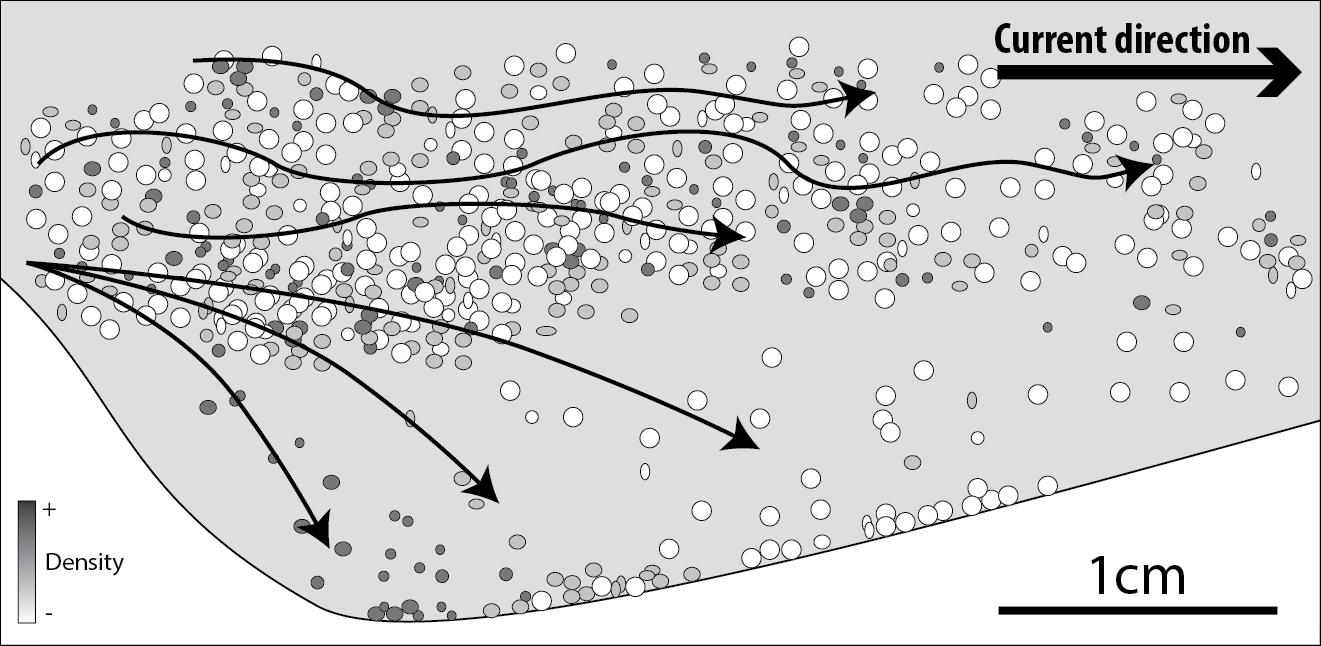
Density sorting of heavy minerals during sediment transport forming placers between ripple marks

== Types of placers ==
=== Alluvial placers ===
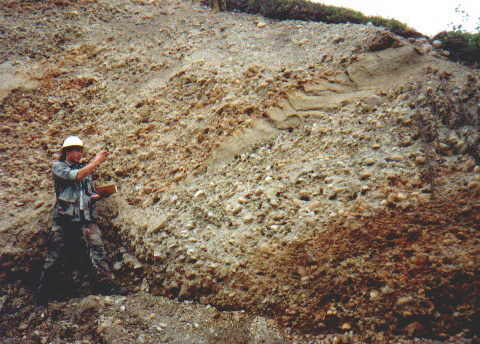
Section of alluvial placer deposit at the Blue Ribbon Mine, Alaska

Alluvial placers are those formed in river or stream sediments. Another name for alluvial placers are stream placers. Typical locations for alluvial gold placer deposits are on the inside bends of rivers and creeks; in natural hollows; at the break of slope on a stream; the base of an escarpment, waterfall or other barrier. Stream placers are the most economical and common types of placers and have provided many with riches in the past.

Alluvial placers are formed by the deposition of dense particles at a site where water velocity remains below that required to transport them further.

To form a placer deposit, the particles desired must show a marked density contrast with the gangue material, which is able to be transported away from the trap site. Only if the deposit is winnowed in this way can the minerals be concentrated to economic levels.

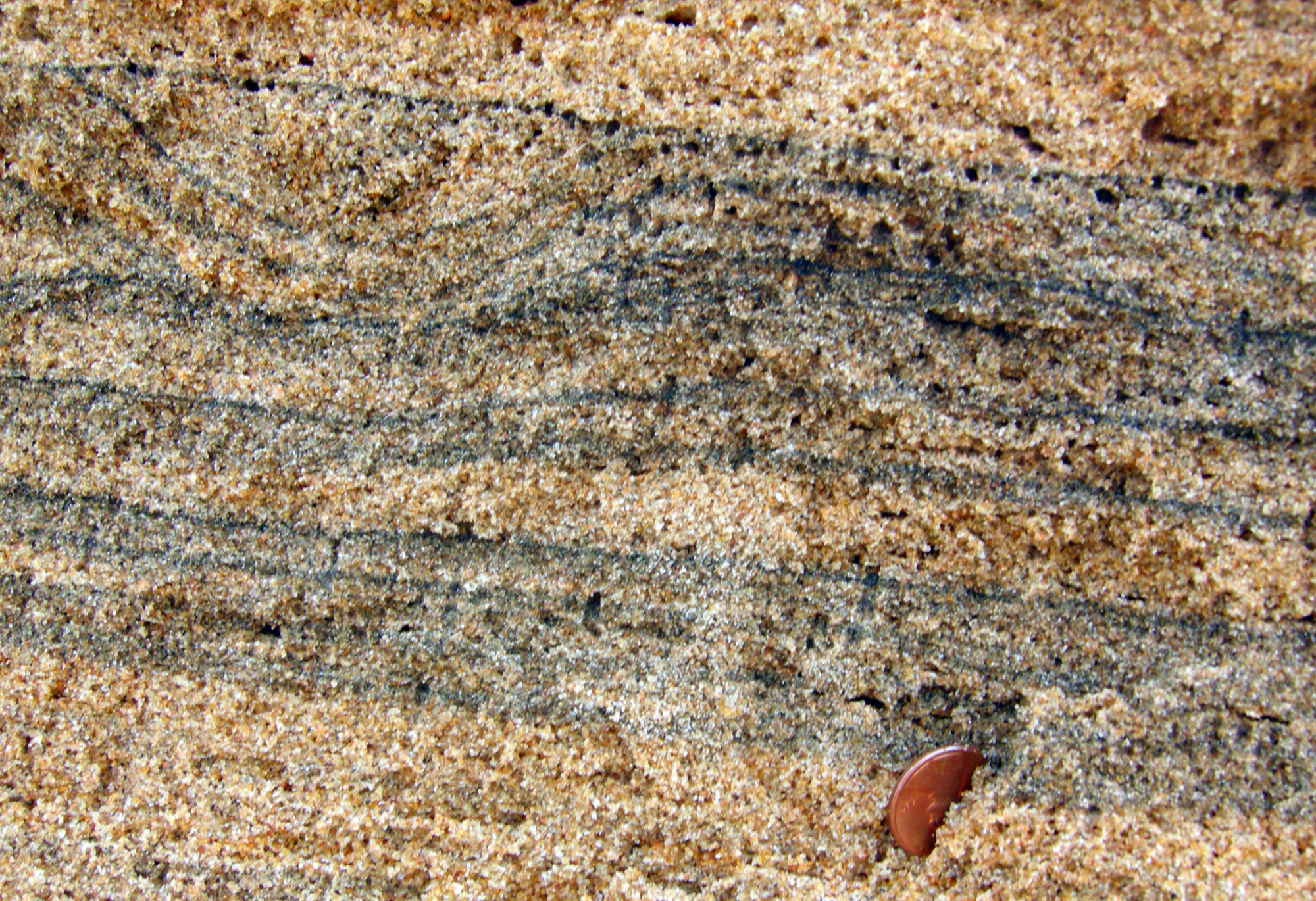
Beach placer deposit of heavy minerals (dark) in a quartz sand (Chennai, India)

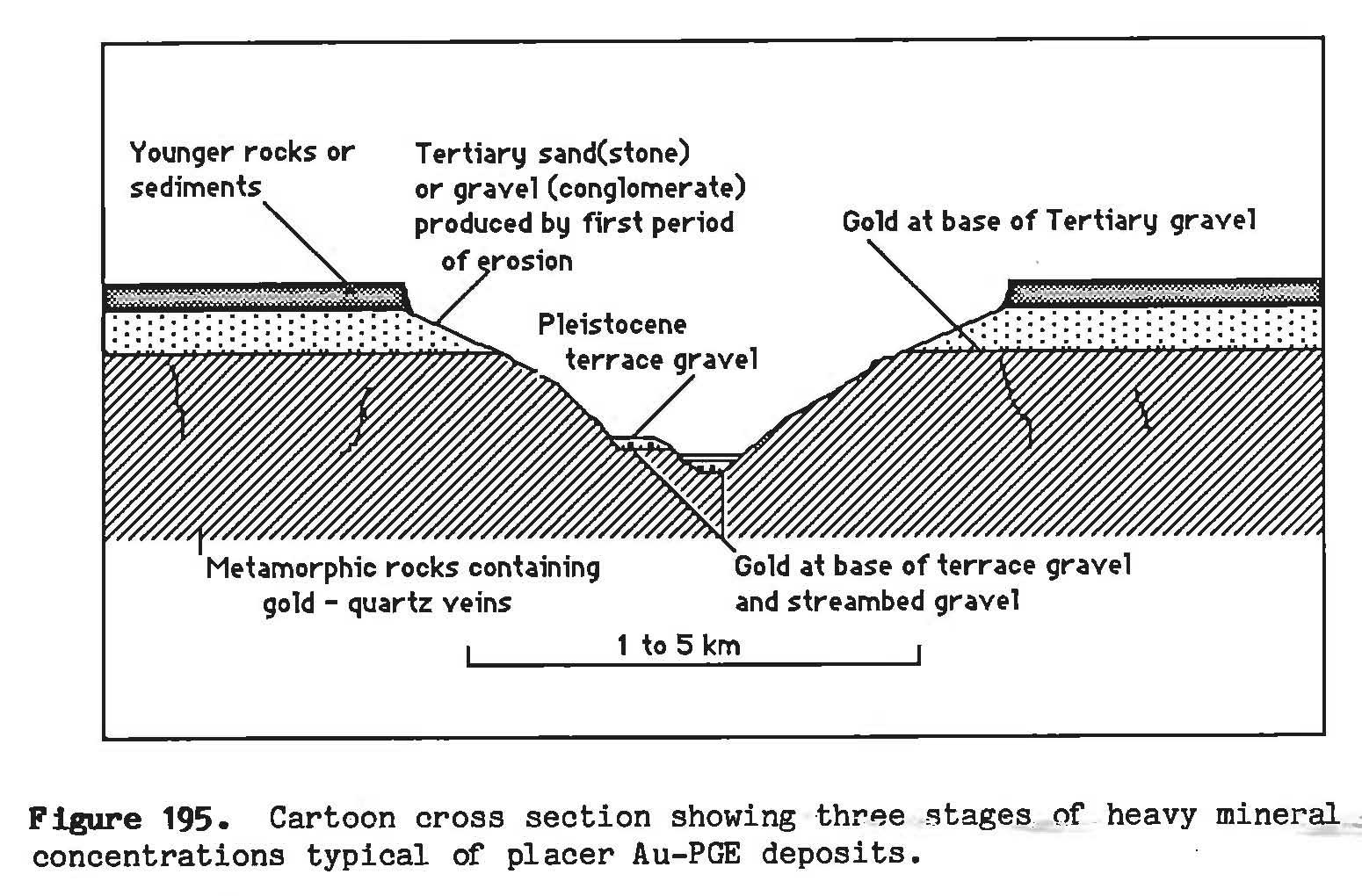
Positions of alluvial and paleoplacer deposits (USGS)

=== Beach placers ===
Beach placers are formed in sand and gravel deposited along the edge of large bodies of water and are typically found where streams or rivers flow into a large body of water. Materials collect as beach placers by continuous wave action and currents. Some important examples of beach placers include black sands of Oregon, gold deposits in Nome, Alaska, zircon sands in Brazil and Australia as well as diamond marine gravel in South Africa.

Gold bearing beach placers consist of large strips of black sands and are typically constantly changing as a result of storms or sporadic wave action. Typically beach placers are populated by ilmenite and magnetite, however gold, platinum and chromite are found in varying amounts. Some of the most productive beach placers are considered ancient beaches that are now far inland from the water, these placers no longer shift with storms and tidal action but with wind and rainfall.

=== Eluvial placers ===
Eluvial placers are deposits of metal formed on hillsides and slopes weathered by rainfall and wind. Lighter materials are carried away and weathered leaving concentrations of valuable metals.

Eluvial placers are typically not large enough to support large scale mining, however in one case in Nevada there has been large scale gold mining operations based on placer deposits at Round Mountain.

=== Aeolian placers ===
Aeolian placers are valuable minerals found in arid regions freed from their source rock by wind actions. Wind erosion leaves a cement like substance in which material like gold are found. Wind action blows sand and dirt away leaving the deposits close to the surface. Historically, aeolian placers have been mined by hand with simple tools by miners due to the proximity to the surface, and small concentration.

Aeolian placers are common in Australia and the Western United states, where the climate is arid and the ground is relatively level leaving wind as the primary erosion force.

=== Paleo-placers ===
Paleo-placer deposits are deposits of minerals from all of the above placer types that occurred millions of years ago. These deposits are typically very far underground in ancient riverbeds, beaches, or slopes. The Witwatersrand Basin, South Africa is the largest gold deposit in the world and is considered a paleo-placer, it has produced over 1.5 billion ounces of gold. The Witwatersrand Basin is considered an ancient alluvial placer.

== Substances mined ==
Substances commercially mined from placer deposits include:

- Diamond
- Gold
- Garnet
- Iron, from ironsands containing high concentrations of magnetite
- Platinum group metals
- Rare-earth elements, from the mineral monazite
- Ruby
- Sapphire
- Thorium, from monazite
- Tin, in the mineral cassiterite
- Titanium, from the minerals ilmenite and rutile
- Uranium, from Precambrian paleoplacers
- Zirconium, from the mineral zircon

== Source rock ==
=== Diamonds ===
Kimberlites are a major source of diamonds. Kimberlites are long "pipes" of lava brought up from the mantle where diamonds form at high temperatures and pressures. These diamonds are then weathered from the source and swept away by alluvial processes (transported by water) to a source that becomes a diamond deposit. Alluvial diamond deposits are mined after removing overburden from the top of the rich, diamond-gravel layer. Roughly 10 percent of diamonds are mined from alluvial diamond placer mines. The Witwatersrand Basin in Africa mentioned above is a recognized alluvial diamond deposit.

== See also ==
- Heavy mineral sands ore deposits
- Black sand
- Placer mining
- Drift mining
- Sedimentology
