= Wall rock =

Rock in walls of an area with geologic activity

Wall rock is the rock that constitutes the wall of an area undergoing geologic activity. Examples are the rock along the neck of a volcano, on the edge of a pluton that is being emplaced, along a fault plane, enclosing a mineral deposit, or where a vein or dike is being emplaced.

In volcanoes, wall rock can often become broken off the wall and incorporated into the erupted volcanic rock as xenoliths. These xenoliths are important to geologists because they can come from rock units that are otherwise not exposed at the Earth's surface.

== See also ==
- Country rock (geology)
