= Glossary of geography terms =

Glossary of geography terms may refer to:

- Glossary of geography terms (A–M)
- Glossary of geography terms (N–Z)
