= Boudinage =

Structures in rock caused by extension

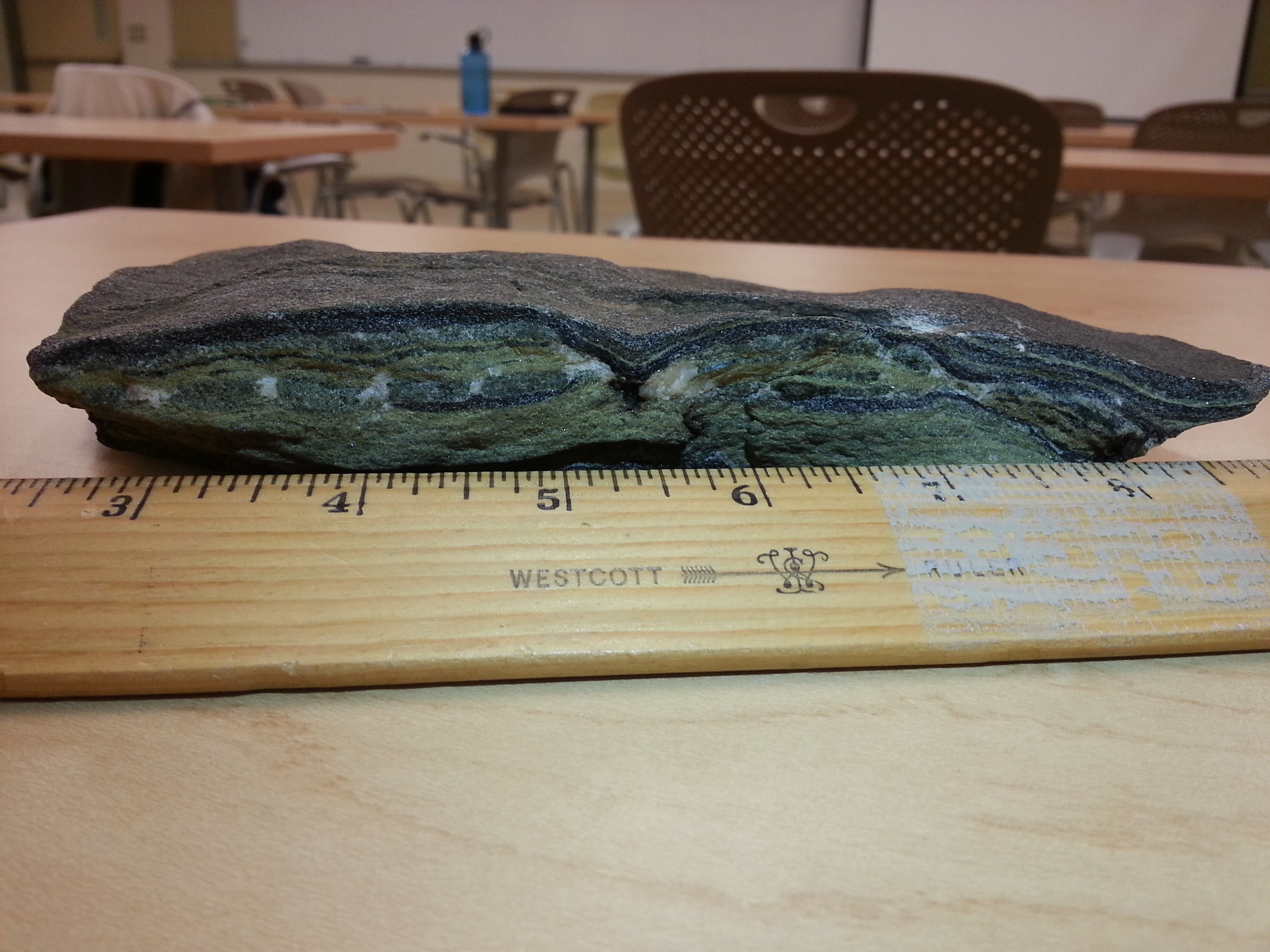
Small-scale boudinage

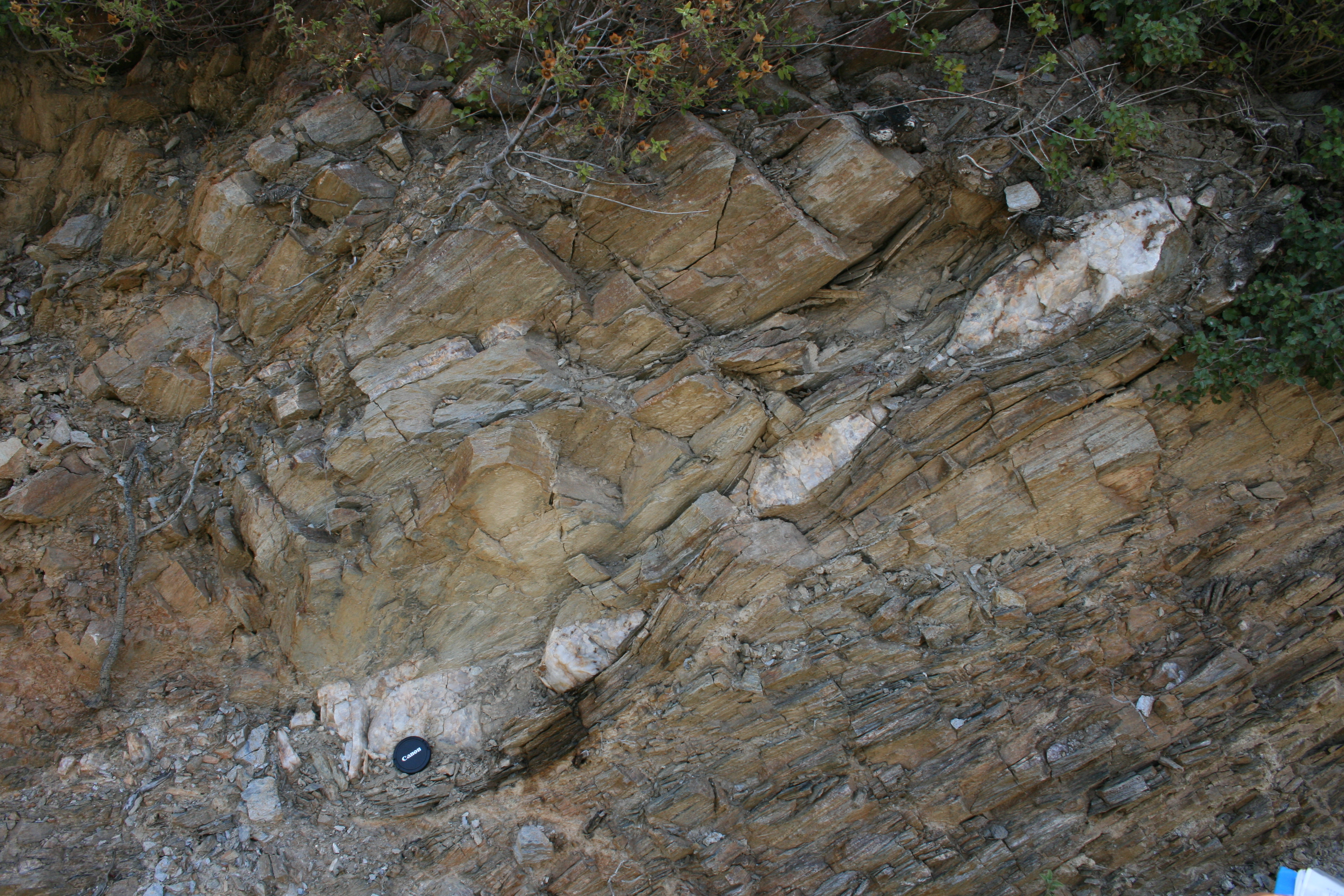
Boudinaged quartz vein within blueschist, Samos, Greece.

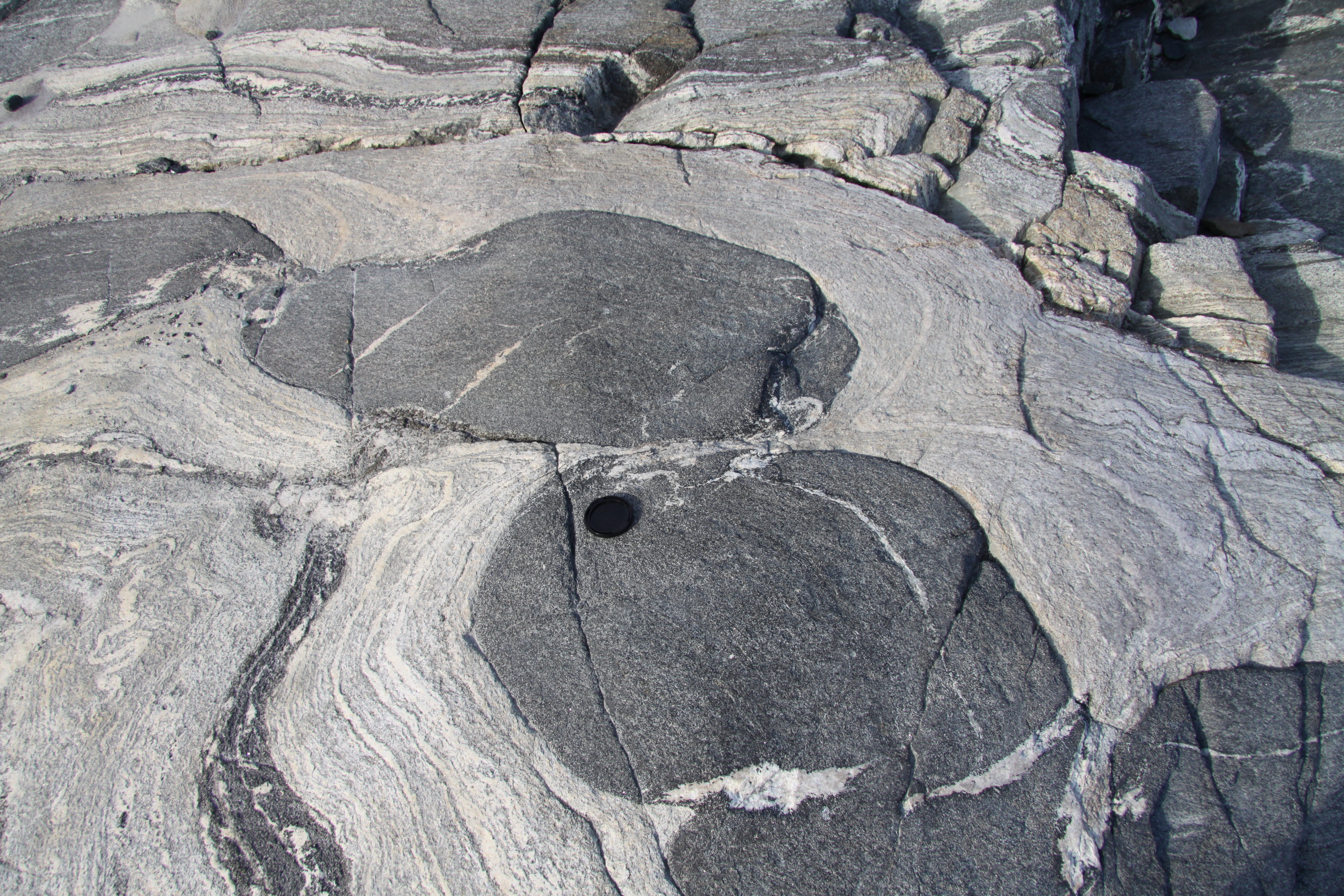
Boudinage in Greenland near Kangerlussuaq

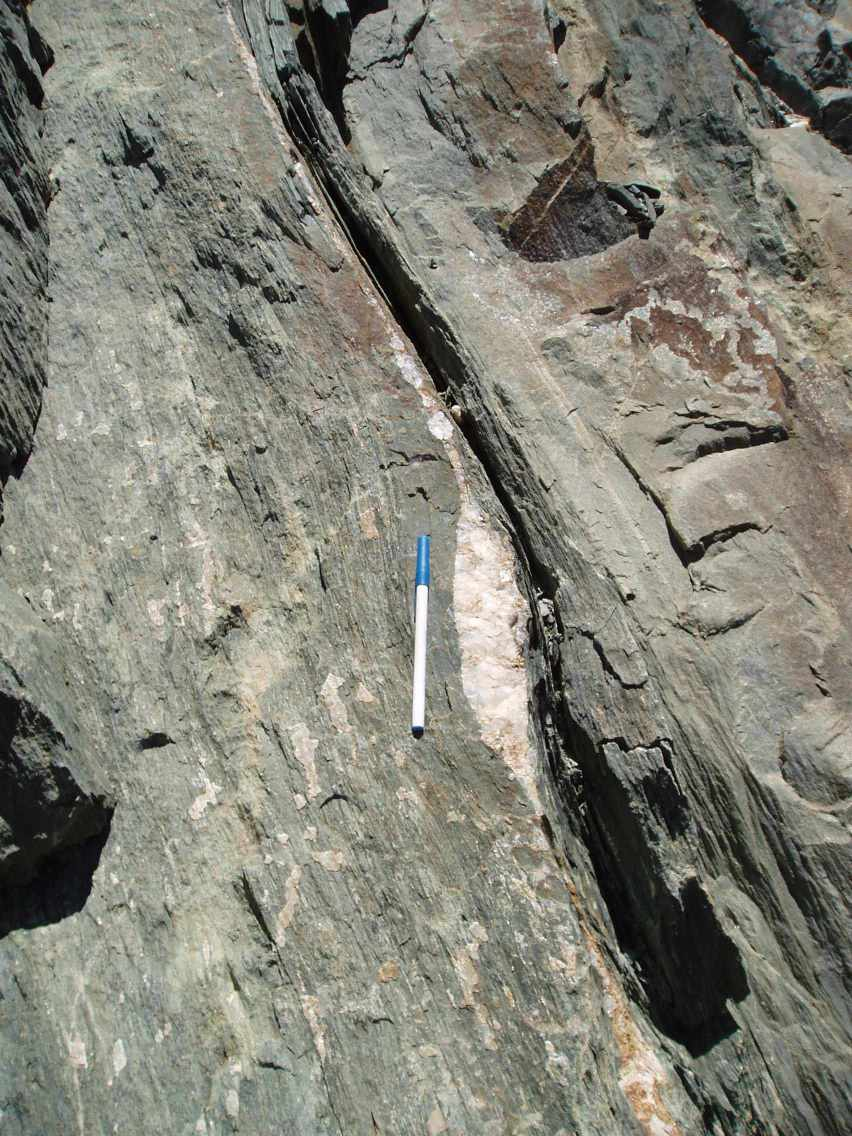
Boudinaged quartz vein in shear foliation, Starlight Pit, Fortnum Gold Mine, Western Australia.

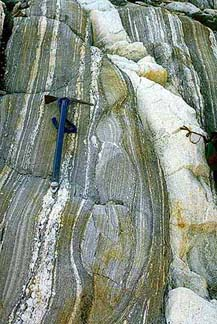
Banded gneiss with dike of granite orthogneiss; competent banded gneiss is boudinaged by ductile shear.

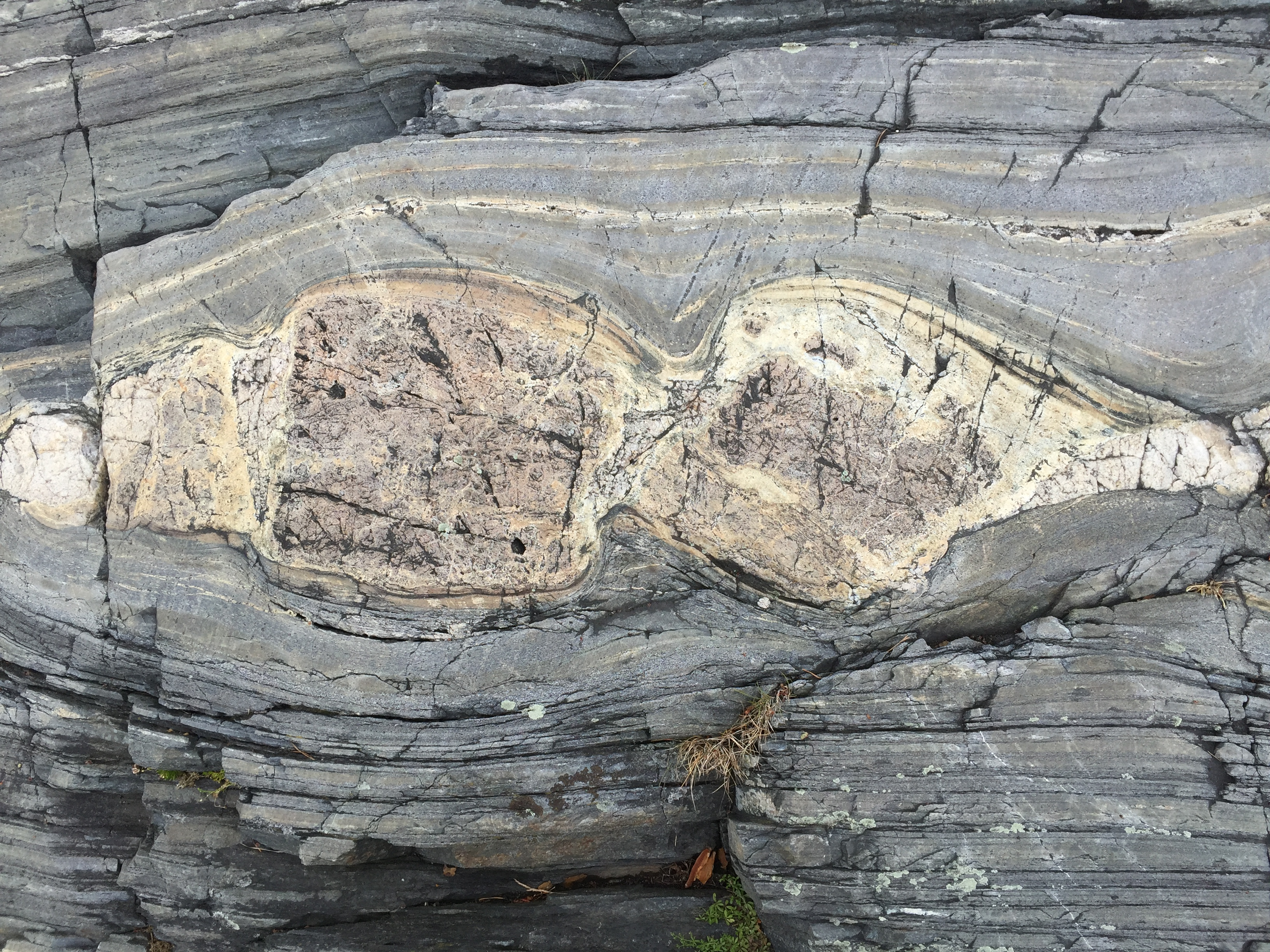
Boudin on the Island of Uto, Stockholm Archipelago, Sweden

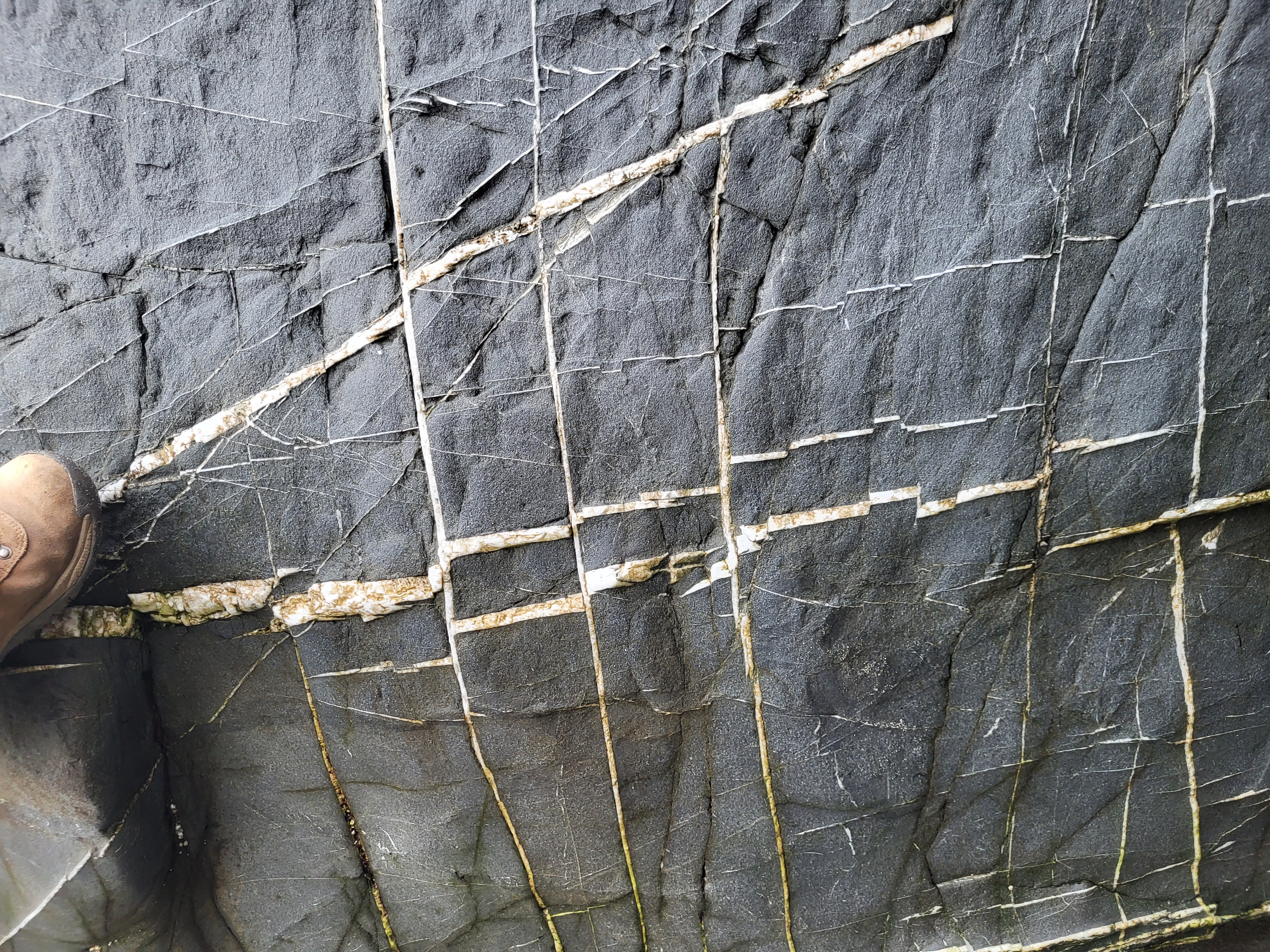
Chocolate-tablet boudinage structures in a low grade metasedimentary rock outcropping in Deception Pass, Washington

Boudinage is a geological term for structures formed by extension, where a rigid tabular body such as hornfels, is stretched and deformed amidst less competent (resistant) surroundings. The competent bed begins to break up, forming sausage-shaped boudins. Boudinage is common and can occur at any scale, from microscopic to lithospheric, and can be found in all terranes. In lithospheric-scale tectonics, boudinage of strong layers can signify large-scale creep transfer of rock matter. The study of boudinage can also help provide insight into the forces involved in tectonic deformation of rocks and their strength.

Boudinage can develop in two ways: planar fracturing into rectangular fragments or by necking or tapering into elongate depressions and swells. Boudins are typical features of sheared veins and shear zones where, due to stretching along the shear foliation and shortening perpendicular to this, rigid bodies break up. This causes the resulting boudin to take a characteristic sausage or barrel shape. They can also form rectangular structures. Ductile deformation conditions also encourage boudinage rather than imbricate fracturing. Boudins can become separated by fractures or vein material; such zones of separation are known as boudin necks.

In three dimensions, the boudinage may take the form of ribbon-like boudins or chocolate-tablet boudins, depending on the axis and isotropy of extension. They range in size from about 20 m thick to about 1 cm.

== Types ==
There are three different types of boudinage. These include no-slip boudinage, s-slip boudinage, and a-slip boudinage. No-slip boudinage occurs when there is no slip, resulting in a symmetrical structure. S-slip boudinage occurs when the boudin moves in opposition to the shear movement, whereas A-slip occurs when it moves with the direction of the shear. These types can be further classified into 5 different groups with relation to their general shape. These groups are drawn, torn, domino, gash and shearband boudins. In general, drawn and torn shapes form where there is a no-slip boudinage, domino and gash boudins by A-slip, and shearband boudins by S-slip boudinage.

== Etymology ==
Lohest (1909) coined the term boudinage, which is derived from the French word "boudin", meaning blood sausage. Boudins were first observed and described by Belgian geologists in the Collignon quarry near Bastogne in the Ardennes (Belgium).
