= Yentna-Cache Creek mining district =

- Alaska Mining District
- Location within Alaska
- Coordinates: 62°00′N 151°30′W
- Country: United States
- State: Alaska

Gold was discovered in the Yentna-Cache Creek Mining District in the U.S. state of Alaska (also known separately as the Yentna District or Cache Creek District) of the upper Susitna River Valley in 1898, soon followed by claim staking. Placer mining was reported in the Cache Creek drainage of the Dutch Hills by 1906. Quaternary glaciofluvial deposits, alluvial deposits, and Cenozoic conglomeratic white quartz-breccia units have been mined in the Dutch Hills. About 200,000 oz (12,000 lb; 5,700 kg) of gold has been produced from these placer deposits.

By 1927, a road from Talkeetna was constructed into the mining area, known today as The Petersville Road. The mining camp of Petersville, Alaska served as the area Post Office for several years in the late 1920s and early 1930s. Two areas have been set aside for recreational gold mining, the North and South units of the Petersville State Recreation Mining Areas. Many smaller one-man and family placer mining operations continue today.

In addition to placer gold mining, this district in the Matanuska-Susitna borough has had some mining of tungsten from scheelite deposits, and small-scale lode mining for gold.

The district is well known due to the influence of artist Sydney Laurence and the still-unsolved murders of four miners in 1939 which gained nationwide attention (see The Mystery of the Cache Creek Murders by Roberta Sheldon).

A steam-powered dragline was used to mine the placer deposits of Peters Creek, below the canyon that cuts through the Peters Hills. The tailings of that operation can be seen today, and the area is part of the Petersville State Recreation Mining Area.

A cluster of deposits is in the main part of the Yentna district, near the Dutch Hills. The productive deposits here have been placer gold deposits with byproduct platinum and locally abundant cassiterite. Gold-bearing lodes in the Yentna district, which have not been as well described, include small and locally very rich deposits associated with felsic dikes and apparently low-grade deposits in major shear and altered zones. Assays exceeding 1 ounce of gold per ton have been obtained from three of these areas, and selected quartz-arsenopyrite vein material from one prospect assayed about 200 oz (13 lb; 5.7 kg) of gold per ton.

== Cache Creek Mine ==
A bucketline dredge was constructed in Cache Creek in the 1920s, and used locally-abundant coal to fire the boilers. Later, a hydroelectric plant was used to run the dredge. The dredge mined the entire valley of Cache Creek as far as the mouth of Nugget Creek, then bulldozers mined what remained. Hydraulic mining was also widely used before 1942, and many ditches can be found all over the Dutch Hills today. About 115,000 ounces of placer gold was reported to have been produced from Cache Creek. An active placer mine operated in 1998–1999.

== The Blue Ribbon Mine ==
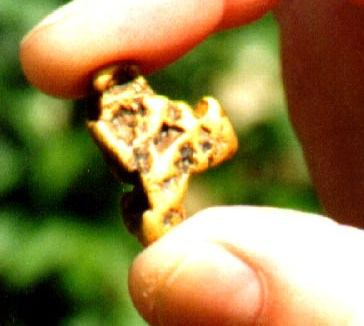
Alaska Gold Nugget, Blue Channel Project

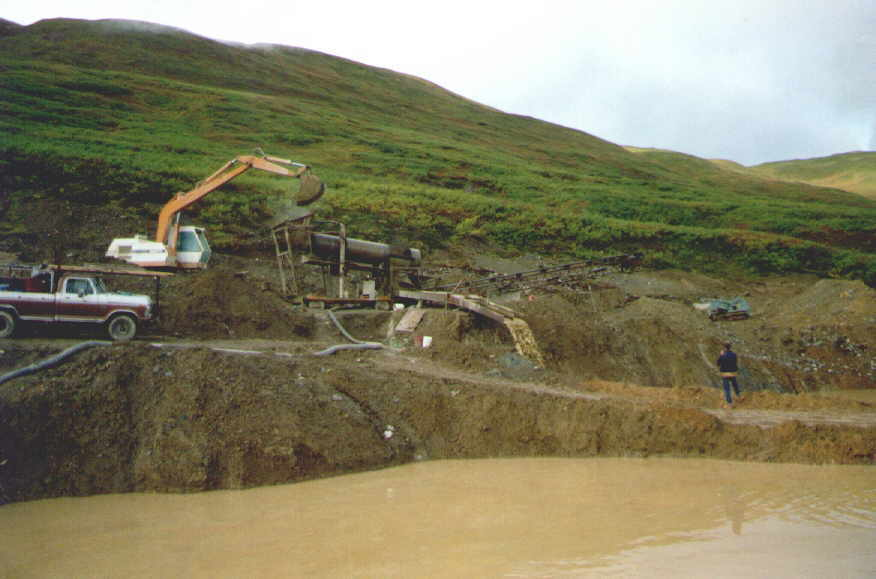
Placer Mine with Trommel, The Blue Ribbon Mine

The first reported mining in what was to become The Blue Ribbon Mine took place in 1906. Except for some stretches when no mining took place, some gold has probably been recovered every year since. The total amount recovered is unknown, but at least 20,000 oz (1,200 lb; 570 kg) have been reported recovered, mostly by small-scale hand or mechanized methods. The placer mine continues operating today, and the company is actively exploring lode deposits.

== See also ==
- Gold mining in Alaska
