= Competence (geology) =

Degree of resistance of rocks to deformation in terms of mechanical strength

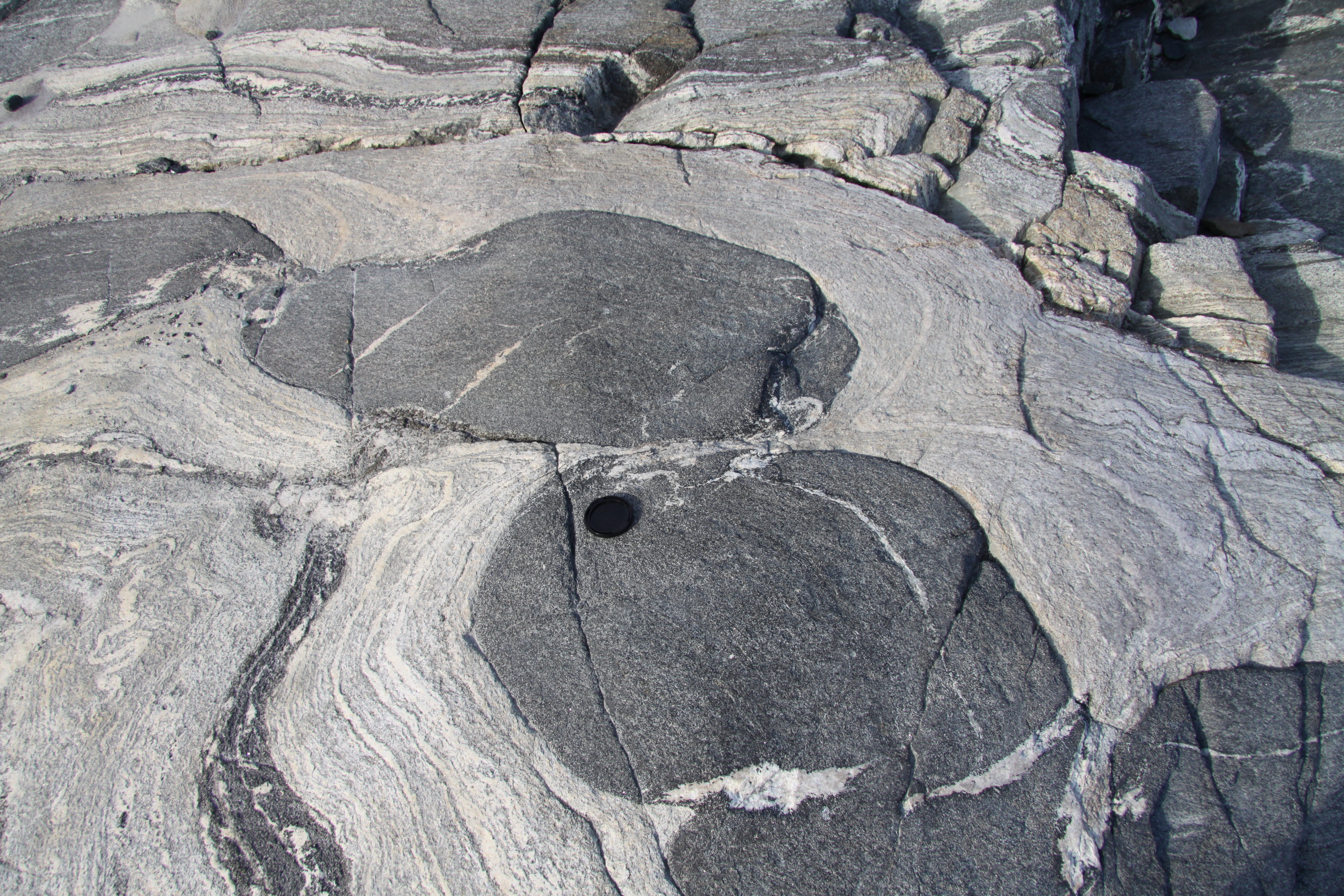
Boudinage of a relatively competent metabasic sheet within quartzofeldspathic gneiss

In geology, competence refers to the degree of resistance of rocks to deformation or flow. In mining, 'competent rocks' are those in which an unsupported opening can be made. More competent rock weathers slower than less competent rock.

== Characteristics ==
Competent rocks are more commonly exposed at outcrops as they tend to form upland areas and high cliffs, or headlands where present on a coastline. Incompetent rocks tend to form lowlands and are often poorly exposed at the surface. During deformation, competent beds tend to deform elastically by either buckling, or faulting and fracturing. Incompetent beds tend to deform more plastically, although it is the competence contrast between different rocks that is most important in determining the types of structure that are formed. The relative competence of rocks may change with temperature, such as in metamorphosed limestones, which are relatively competent at low metamorphic grade, but become highly incompetent at high metamorphic grade.

Most sedimentary and volcanic sequences show layering between different lithologies. When affected by deformation, the response of the sequence depends on the competence of the various layers.

Crystal plasticity becomes more important as the temperature increases, and the relative deformability of individual minerals controls the competence of particular rock units.
