= Country rock (geology) =

Rock types native to a specific area

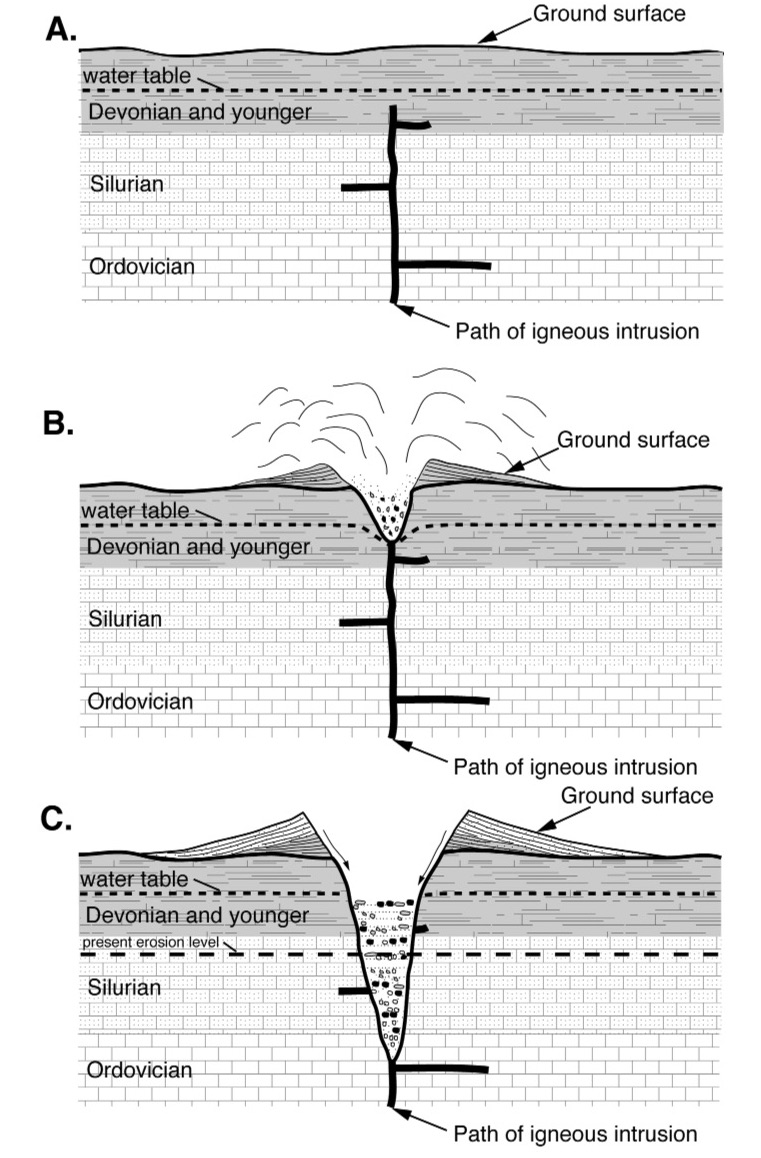
All of "Devonian and younger", "Silurian", and "Ordovician" are country rock. The igneous intrusion leads to a volcanic eruption.

Country rock in geology is the rock native to an area, in contrast to any intrusion of viscous geologic material, commonly magma, or perhaps rock salt (in salt domes) or unconsolidated sediments.

Magma is typically less dense than the rock it intrudes, widening and filling existing cracks, sometimes melting the already-existing country rock.

The term country rock is similar to, and in many cases interchangeable with, the terms basement and wall rocks.

Country rock can denote the widespread lithology of a region in relation to the rock which is being discussed or observed.

== Geologic settings ==
Settings in geology when the term country rock is used include:

=== Igneous intrusions ===
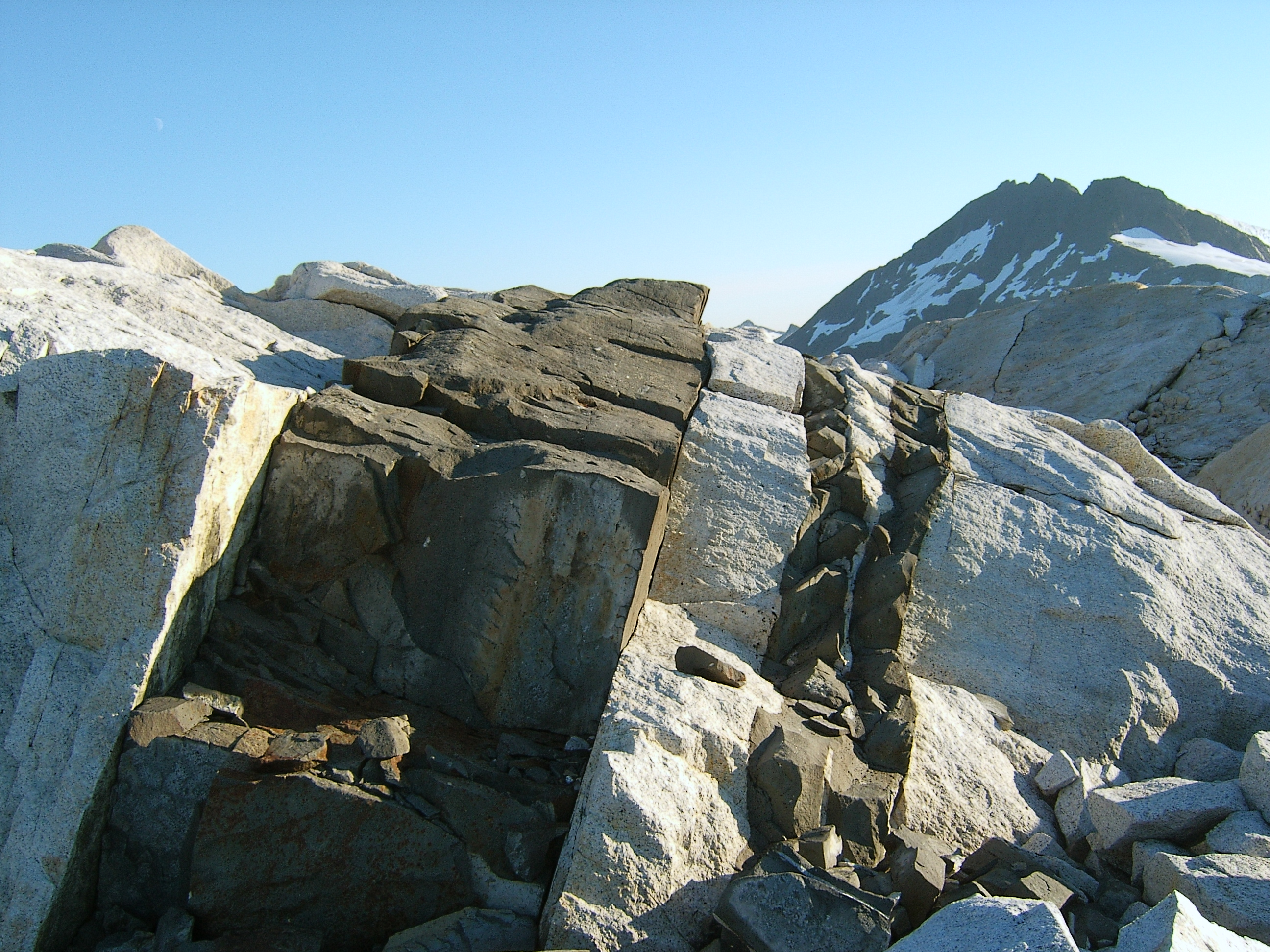
A dike (dark) intrudes into the country rock (light), Baranof Island, Alaska, United States

When describing a pluton or dike, the igneous rock can be described as intruding the surrounding country rock, the rock into which the pluton has intruded.

When country rock is intruded by a dike, perpendicular to the bedding plane, it is called discordant intrusion, while a parallel intrusion by a sill indicates a sub-parallel or concordant intrusion.

Most intrusions into country rock are via magma. Usually, country rock is intruded by an igneous body of rock which formed when magma forced upward through fractures, or melted through overlying rock. Magma then cooled into solid rock, different from the surrounding country rock. Sometimes, a fragment of country rock will break off and become incorporated into the intrusion, and is called a xenolith, from Greek, ξένος, xenos, "strange", and λίθος, lithos, the ancient Greek word for "stone."

The heat of the intrusions usually changes the country rock, often to contact metamorphic rock. Commonly, hornfels is produced, or skarn.

=== Alluvial settings ===
When describing recent alluvium, the material that has arrived through volcanic, glacial or fluvial action can be described as a veneer on the (older) country rock.
