= List of rock textures =

List of rock textural and morphological terms

This page is intended to be a list of rock textural and morphological terms.

== A ==
- Adcumulate
- Agglomeritic
- Adamantine a type of lustre
- Amygdaloidal
- Anhedral
- Antitaxial veins
- Aphanitic
- Aplitic; aplite
- Augen textured gneiss
- Axiolitic texture

== B ==
- Botryoidal
- Brecciated
- Bedding fissile; bedding fissility
- Boudinage; boudins

== C ==
- Cataclastic
- Chilled margin
- Clastic; see also breccia
- Cleaved
- Crenulated
- Cross-bedding
- Cross-stratification; also trough-cross stratification.
- Cumulate; see also layered intrusion

== D ==
- Decussate
- Devitirification; devitrified
- Dendritic texture; dendrites
- Diatextite; see also schlieren and migmatite

== E ==
- Embayed minerals; see igneous texture
- Equigranular
- Euhedral
- Eutaxitic
- Epiclastic

== F ==
- Fiamme
- Foliation
- Fissile; see also Bedding fissility.
- Fossiliferous

== G ==
- Glomeroporphyritic
- Gneissose; gneissic
- Granoblastic
- Granophyric
- Granulitic
- Graphic

== H ==
- Holocrystalline
- Hyaline texture
- Hyalopilitic

== I ==
- Imbricate
- Intergrowth texture

== J ==
- Jointed

== K ==
- Kelyphitic

== L ==
- Lepidoblastic
- Leucocratic
- Lineation, lineated
- L-tectonite

== M ==
- Melanocratic
- Mesocratic
- Mesocumulate
- Mylonitic

== N ==
- Nematoblastic

== O ==
- Ocelli
- Oolitic; see also limestone
- Ophitic texture
- Orbicular texture
- Orthocumulate

== P ==
- Panidiomorphic
- Pegmatitic
- Peloidal
- Perthitic
- Phaneritic
- Phyllitic
- Pisolitic
- Poikilitic
- Poikiloblastic
- Porphyroclastic
- Porphyroblastic
- Porphyritic texture; see also porphyry
- Ptygmatic (folding); see migmatite

== Q ==
- Quench textures; see obsidian, tachylyte or aphanitic

== R ==
- Rapakivi texture

== S ==
- Sandy
- Schistose; schistosity
- Seriate texture
- Shear; sheared; shear fabric
- Slaty; slaty cleavage
- Specular
- Spherulite
- Spinifex texture; see also komatiite
- S-tectonite
- Stratabound
- Stratum
- Stromatolitic
- Stylolitic
- Subhedral
- Symplectite

== T ==
- Tuffaceous
- Trachytic texture

== V ==
- Vesicular texture
- Variolitic
- Vitreous
- Vuggy

== See also ==
- Crystallography
- Fracture (geology)
- Fracture (mineralogy)
- List of minerals
- List of rock types
- Rock microstructure
