= Vitrophyre =

Glassy volcanic rock

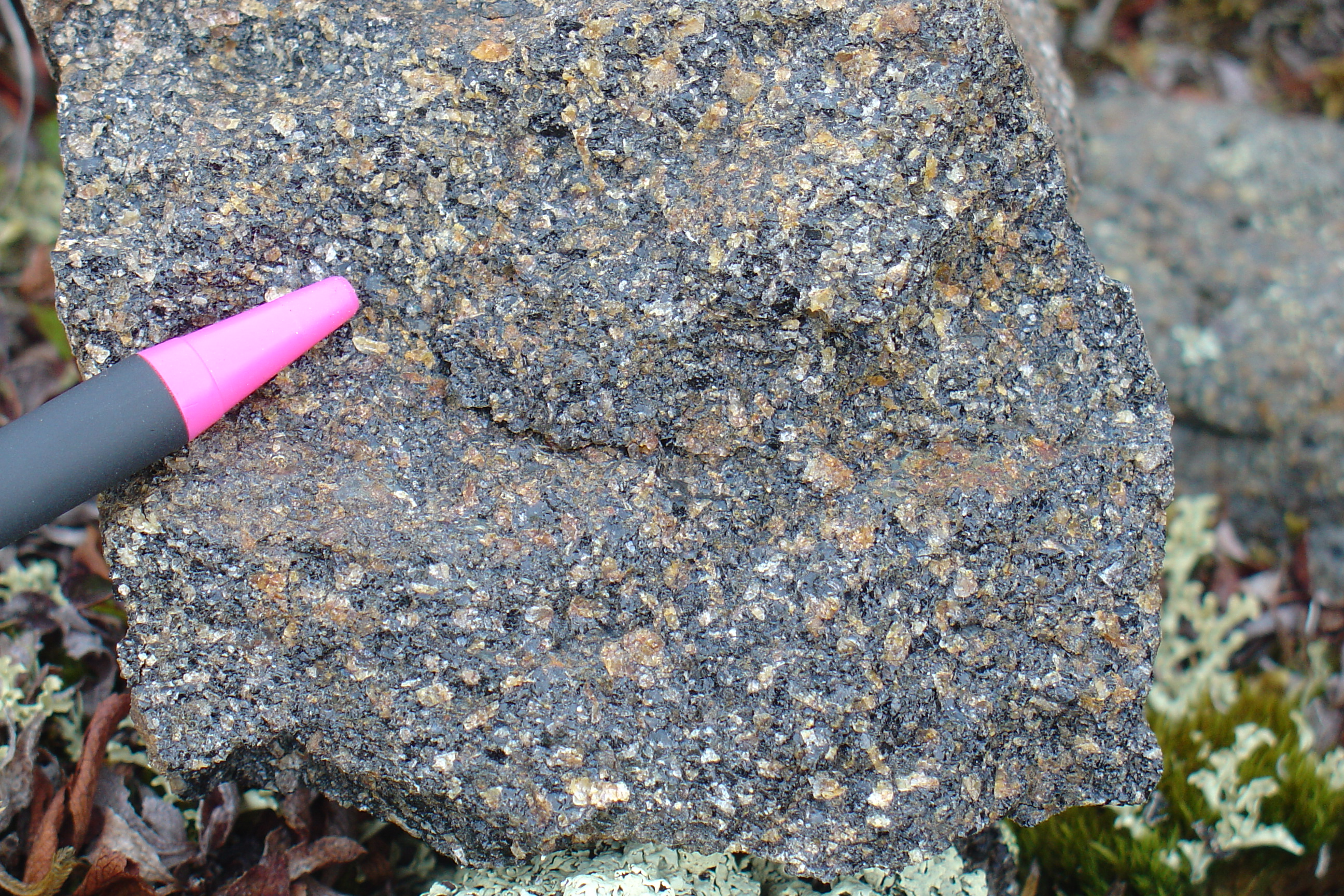
Example of a rhyolitic vitrophyre; large phenocrysts are set in the black glassy matrix

A vitrophyre is a porphyritic volcanic rock in which phenocrysts are embedded in a glassy matrix. Vitrophyres are contrasted from typical porphyritic rocks in that the latter has both crystalline phenocrysts (larger grains) and a crystalline matrix (smaller grains), whereas the former has a distinctly glassy matrix. Vitrophyres can be alternatively described as rocks having vitrophyric texture. This texture results from the rapid quenching of a lava where phenocrysts had started to form prior to eruption.

== See also ==
- Obsidian
- Poikilitic texture
- Tachylite
