= Staurolite =

Reddish brown to black nesosilicate mineral

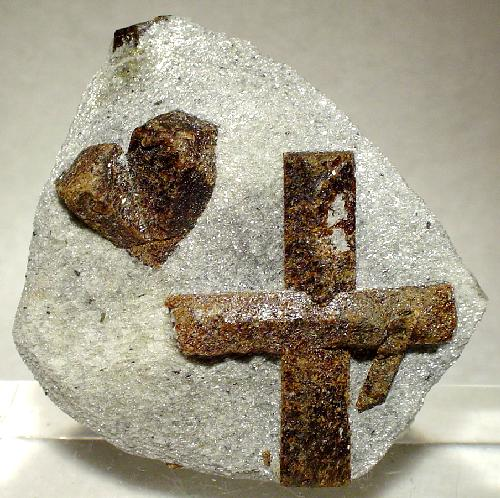
- Staurolite from Pestsovye Keivy, Keivy Mountains, Kola Peninsula, Murmanskaja Oblast', Northern Region, Russia, 2.5 × 2.2 × 1 cm

General
- Category: Nesosilicate
- Formula: Fe^{2+}_{2}Al_{9}O_{6}(SiO_{4})_{4}(O,OH)_{2}
- IMA symbol: St
- Strunz classification: 9.AF.30
- Crystal system: Monoclinic
- Crystal class: Prismatic (2/m) (same H-M symbol)
- Space group: C2/m
- Unit cell: a = 7.86 Å, b = 16.6 Å c = 5.65 Å; β = 90.45°; Z = 2

Identification
- Color: Dark reddish brown to blackish brown, yellowish brown, rarely blue; pale golden yellow in thin section
- Crystal habit: Commonly in prismatic crystals
- Twinning: Commonly as 60° twins, less common as 90° cruciform twins
- Cleavage: Distinct on {010}
- Fracture: Subconchoidal
- Tenacity: Brittle
- Mohs scale hardness: 7 – 7.5
- Luster: Subvitreous to resinous
- Streak: White to grayish
- Diaphaneity: Transparent to opaque
- Specific gravity: 3.74 – 3.83 meas. 3.686 calc.
- Optical properties: Biaxial (+)
- Refractive index: n_{α} = 1.736 – 1.747 n_{β} = 1.740 – 1.754 n_{γ} = 1.745 – 1.762
- Birefringence: δ = 0.009 – 0.015
- Pleochroism: X = colorless; Y = pale yellow; Z = golden yellow
- 2V angle: Measured: 88°, Calculated: 84° to 88°
- Dispersion: r > v; weak

Staurolite is a reddish brown to black, mostly opaque, nesosilicate mineral with a white streak. It crystallizes in the monoclinic crystal system, has a Mohs hardness of 7 to 7.5 and the chemical formula: Fe^{2+}_{2}Al_{9}O_{6}(SiO_{4})_{4}(O,OH)_{2}. Magnesium, zinc and manganese substitute in the iron site and trivalent iron can substitute for aluminium.

== Properties ==
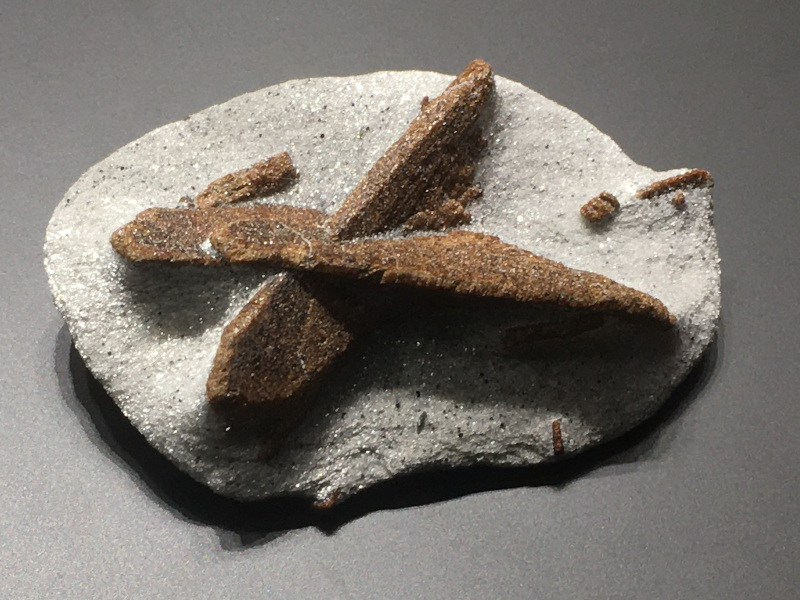
Staurolite specimen

Staurolite often occurs twinned in a characteristic cross-shape, called cruciform penetration twinning. In handsamples, macroscopically visible staurolite crystals are of prismatic shape. The mineral often forms porphyroblasts.

In thin sections staurolite is commonly twinned and shows lower first order birefringence similar to quartz, with the twinning displaying optical continuity. It can be identified in metamorphic rocks by its swiss cheese appearance (with poikilitic quartz) and often mantled porphyroblastic character.

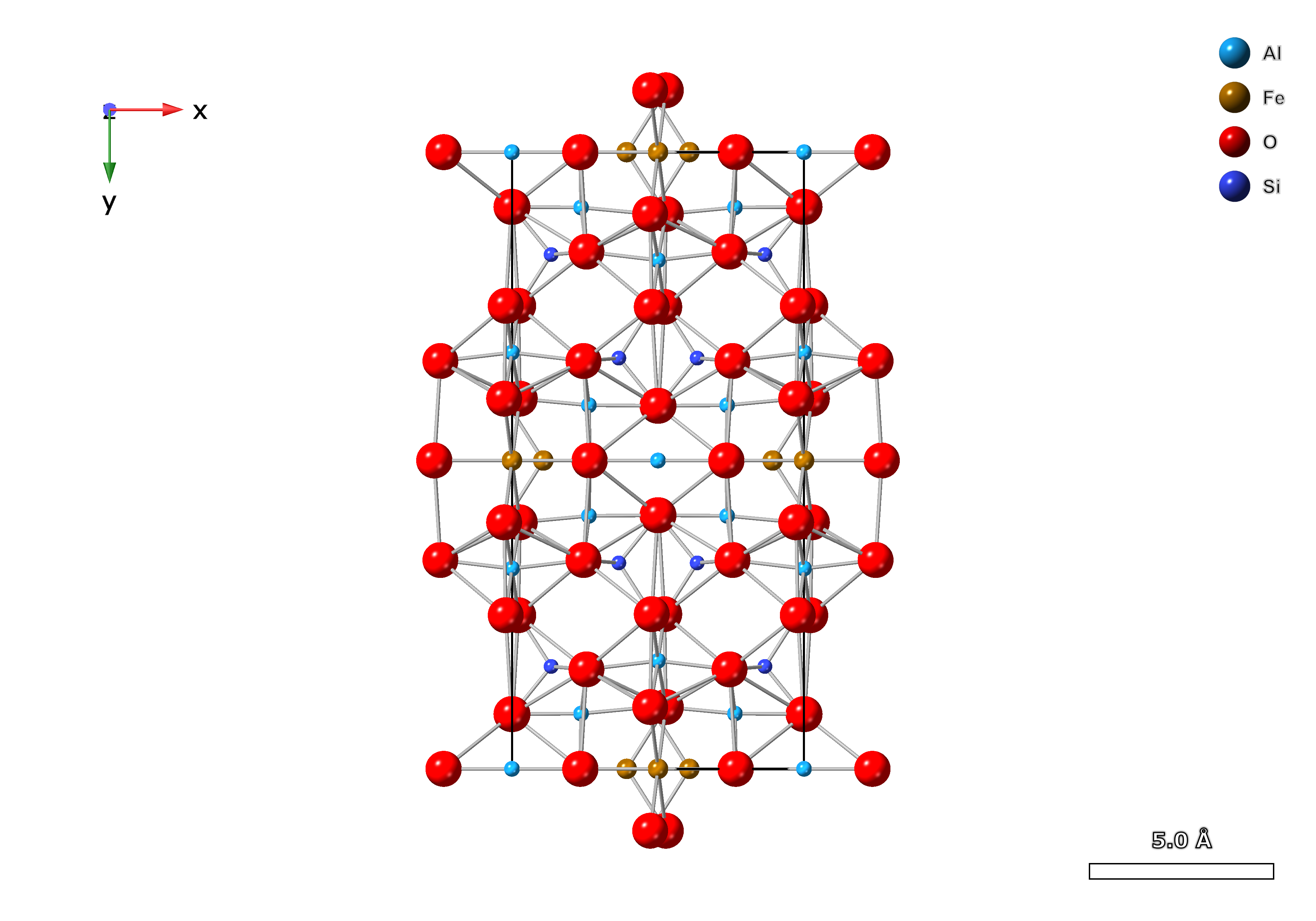
Crystal structure of staurolite

== Name ==
The name is derived from the Greek, stauros for cross and lithos for stone in reference to the common twinning.

== Occurrence ==
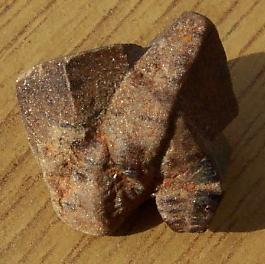
Staurolite from Madagascar

Staurolite is a regional metamorphic mineral of intermediate to high grade. It occurs with almandine garnet, micas, kyanite; as well as albite, biotite, and sillimanite in gneiss and schist of regional metamorphic rocks.

It is the official state mineral of the U.S. states of Georgia And New Mexico and is also to be found in the Lepontine Alps in Switzerland.

Staurolite is most commonly found in Fannin County, Georgia. It is also found in Fairy Stone State Park in Patrick County, Virginia. The park is named for a local name for staurolite from a legend in the area. Samples are also found in Island Park, Idaho, near Henrys Lake; Taos, New Mexico; near Blanchard Dam in Minnesota; and Selbu, Norway.

== Use ==
Staurolite is one of the index minerals that are used to estimate the temperature, depth, and pressure at which a rock undergoes metamorphism.
