= Ophite =

Ophite or Ophitic may refer to:

- Ophites, an ancient Gnostic sect in Syria and Egypt
- Ophite, originally according to Pliny the Elder for a greenish spotted rock, now a type of stone with a characteristic texture of certain dolerites after an occurrence in the Pyrenees
- Ophitic, a type of poikilitic texture in igneous rocks
- Ophitic dialect, a variant of Pontic Greek
