= Tachylite in Victorian archaeological sites =

Glassy volcanic stone discovered in Victoria, Australia, archaeological sites

Coordinates: 37°18′57″S 144°20′29″E

Tachylite is an unusual and relatively rare stone used in making flaked stone tools, and which is found in Aboriginal archaeological sites in Victoria, Australia.

It was sourced from Spring Hill near Lauriston, Victoria, and there is another historical reference to a source at Green Hill near Trentham, Victoria, but the exact location has not been confirmed. Daniel James Mahony described ...water worn pebbles of pitchstone, a highly silicious volcanic glass associated with tachylite on the Coliban River. Mitchell refers to the distribution of the material with: Small artefacts are common at Willaura, Burrumbeet, Inverleigh, Point Cook and as far north as Dooen near Horsham.

Since 2016 the material is found on further sites on the traditional lands of the Dja Dja Wurrung who were well regarded by other groups for the hard glassy stone that all valued and traded to use for superior stone weapons and tools. Examples are held in the collection of the Castlemaine Art Museum.

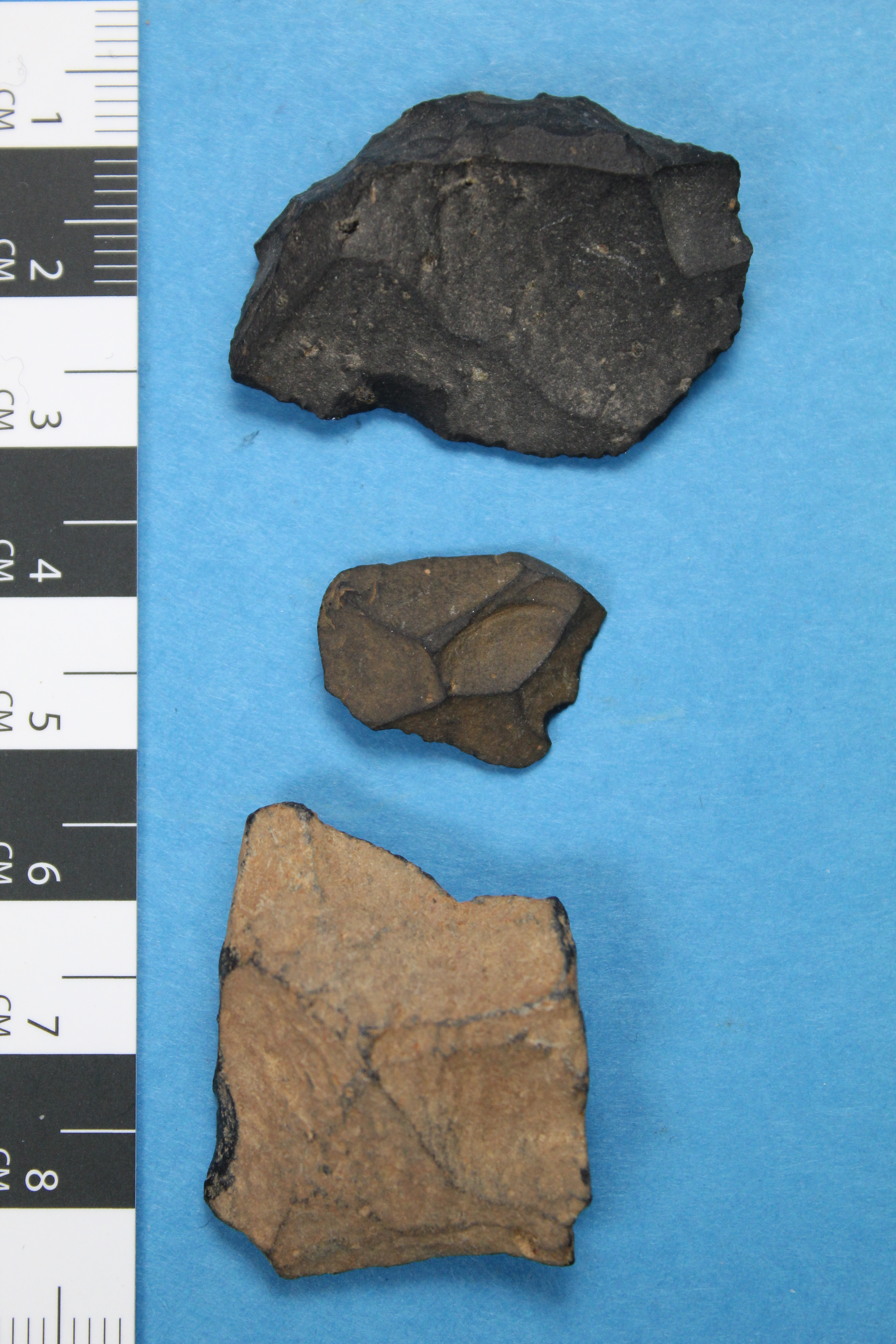
Tachylite flaked artefacts

Tachylite is a type of volcanic opaque glass, and is applied to basalts with a glassy matrix that contain scattered small phenocrysts (pyroxene, plagioclase, olivine). Aboriginal artefacts flaked from the material are characterised by a black internal colour, which is very often patinated on the surface to a pale grey. This patina rapidly darkens on contact with the skin, turning as dark as the core. Only a few pieces are generally found in archaeological assemblages in southern Victoria and around Melbourne, apart from at sites near Spring Hill, Kyneton, where it is the most common material.

Tachylite artefacts have been noted in Aboriginal sites in Victoria from at least the 1920s, when W. H. Gill recorded its occurrence in a large stone artefact and camp site complex at Cape Liptrap.

Tachylite has also been identified as a material used in manufacturing flaked stone artefacts in archaeological sites in Europe, North America, and India.

== See also ==
Volcanic glass
