= Granoblastic =

Granoblastic is an adjective describing an anhedral phaneritic equi-granular metamorphic rock texture. Granoblastic texture is typical of quartzite, marble, charnockites and other non-foliated metamorphic rocks without porphyroblasts. Characteristics defining granoblastic texture include: grains visible to the unaided eye, sutured boundaries, and approximately equidimensional grains. The grain boundaries intersect at 120° triple junctions under ideal conditions.

A rock that has a granoblastic texture can be termed a granofels.
