= Hyalopilitic =

Hyalopilitic is a textural term used in petrographic classification of volcanic rocks. Specifically, hyalopilitic refers to a volcanic rock groundmass, which is visible only under magnification with a petrographic microscope, that contains a mixture of very fine-grained mineral crystals either mixed with natural volcanic glass, or surrounded by thin bands of volcanic glass.

== See also ==
- List of rock textures
- Rock microstructure
- Obsidian
