= Variolite =

Igneous rocks which contain varioles

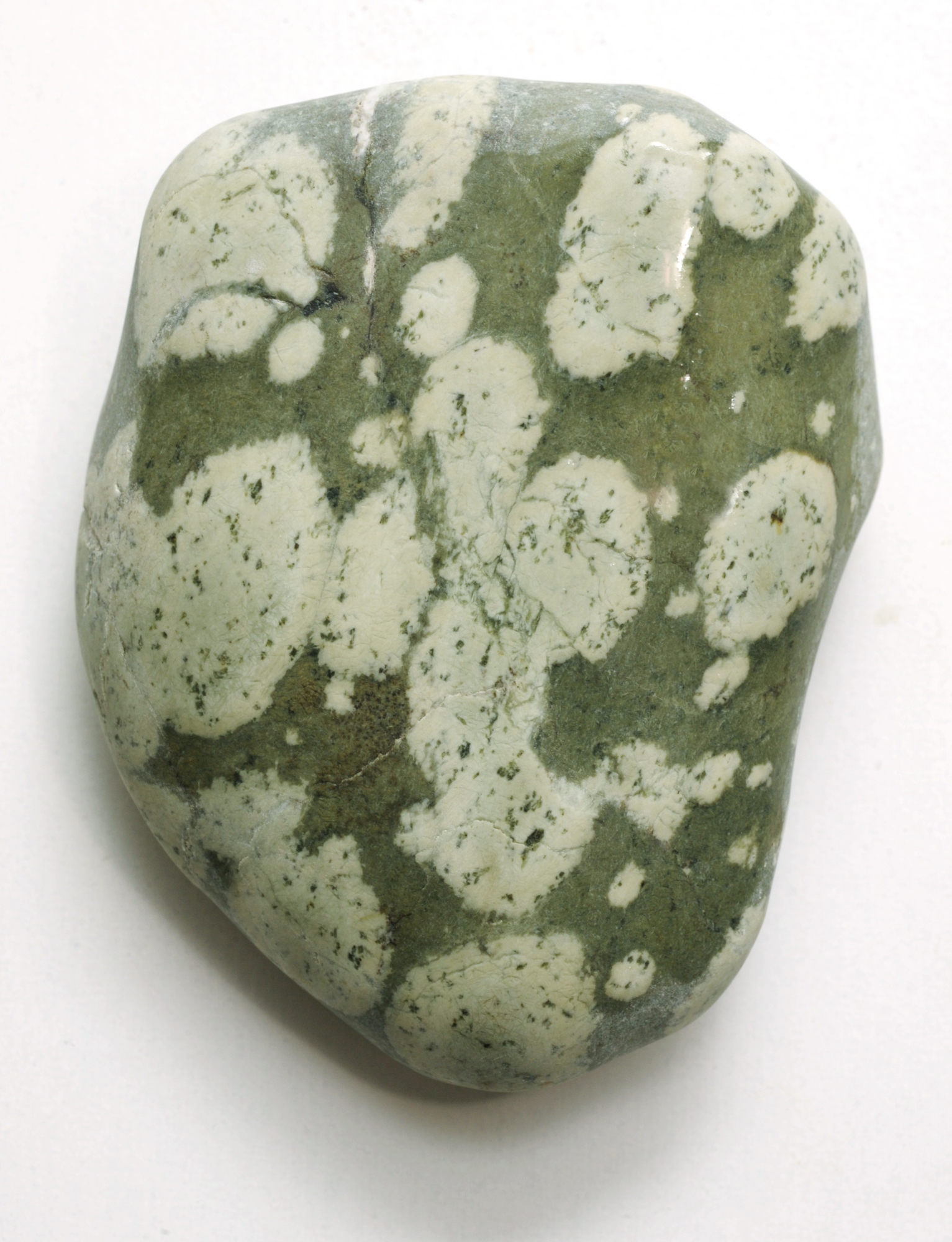
Beach pebble of variolitic pillow lava (varolite) from the Olympic Peninsula, Washington state

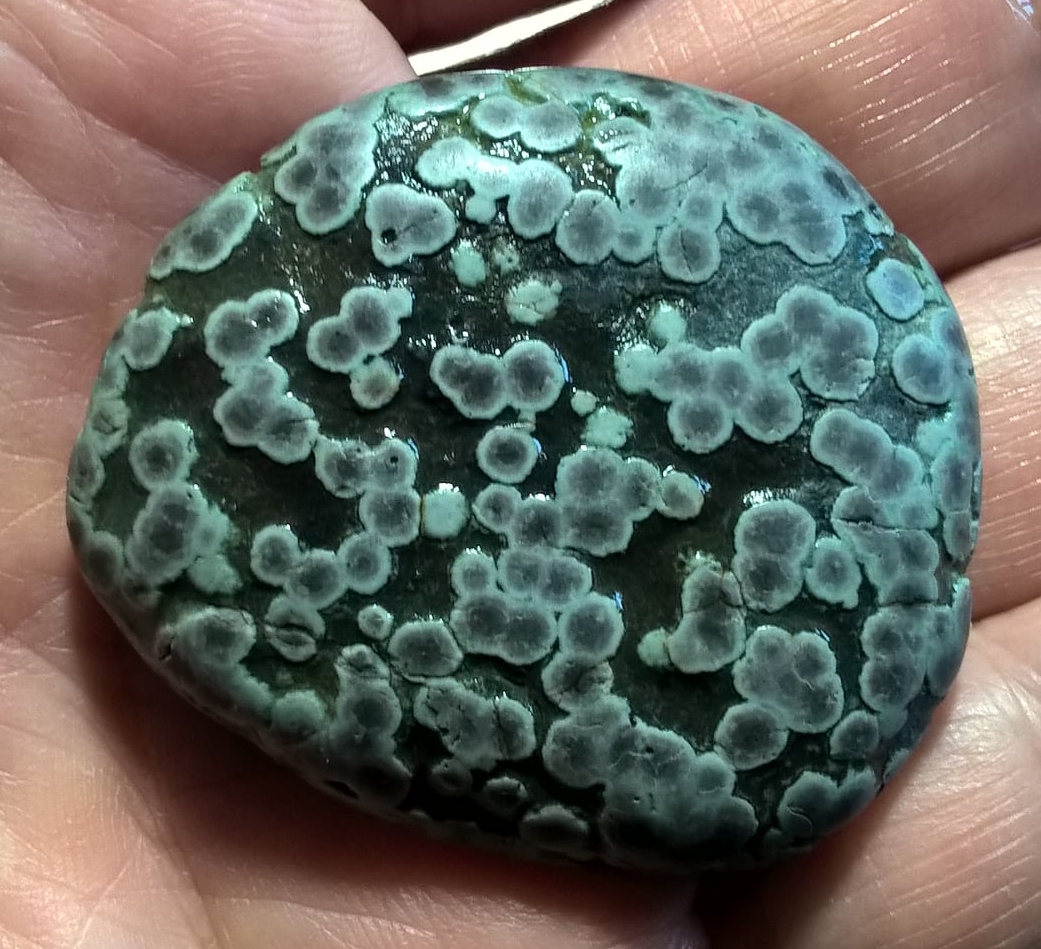
Variolite pebble, Maguelone, Hérault, France.

Variolites are mafic, igneous, and typically volcanic rocks, e.g. tholeiite, basalt or komatiite, that contain centimeter-scale spherical or globular structures, called varioles, in a fine-grained matrix. These structures are lighter colored than the host rock and typically range in diameter from 0.05mm to over 5 cm. In 1648, Aldrovandi created the term variolite for aphanitic or fine-grained igneous rocks containing varioles. The weathering of varioles often cause variolites to have a pock-marked appearance. In allusion to the pock-marked appearance of weathered surfaces of variolite, this term is derived from the Latin word, variola, for smallpox.

Varioles are millimeter- to centimeter-scale, light-colored, globular to spherical structures, that are conspicuously observable within aphanitic, mafic igneous rocks, such as basalt, komatiite, and tachylite, that comprise either pillow lavas, subaerial lava flows, or volcanic dykes. Typically, they are less resistant to weathering than the enclosing aphanitic rock and, as a result, form pock-marks on the weathered surfaces of mafic rocks.

In the geologic literature, the usage of the term variole has been inconsistent and confusing. Initially, they were defined as spherical masses, which may or may not be spherulites, that are observed on the weathering surfaces of some basalts and diabases. In some modern literature, the term variole is defined as a type of spherulite that occurs in a mafic rock. However, because several different mechanisms can produce these small-scale, light-colored, globular to spherical structures, a specific set of varioles may or may not be spherulites that are composed of radiating crystals of either plagioclase or pyroxene. As a result, it is recommended that the term variole should be retained as originally defined. This definition is useful, not only because varioles may arise through several different mechanisms, but also because the alteration, specifically mineralization, and deformation associated with many Precambrian volcanic rocks, particularly Archean volcanic rocks, makes the determination of their origin difficult, if not impossible, without further laboratory analyses. Phillips (1973) provides a detailed review of the nomenclature of different types of varioles that have been proposed. Confusingly, a few Earth scientists use variolite as if it is synonymous with variole.

Petrographic and geochemical analyses of varioles demonstrates that they can be the result of one of three possible processes. They are the blotchy alteration of a fine-grained igneous rock; the mingling of magma from two distinctly different sources; and the alteration and degradation of plagioclase spherulites. These analyses also found that their internal organization and geochemistry is incompatible with the hypothesis that they are quenched immiscible liquids, as has been suggested in the past by various authors.

== Varieties and occurrence ==
The variety of mafic igneous rocks that contain varioles are, with rare exceptions, no longer classified as variolites, which is not recommended for usage. Instead, they are designated using the modifier variolitic in conjunction with the major lithology. The major varieties of variolites are variolitic basalts, variolitic pillow lavas and variolitic komatiites. Variolitic pillow lavas, that have been previously identified as variolites and also classified as spilites, are found in the Durance, France; on Mont Genvre, France; in Devonian rocks of Germany; and as cobbles on the beaches of the Strait of Juan de Fuca along the northern edge of the Olympic Peninsula. Variolitic basalts and variolitic komatiites occur commonly as Archean lava flows in the greenstone belts of South Africa and the Canadian Shield. Finally, there is a group of spotted volcanic rocks formerly known to French petrographers as the variolites du Drac from the locality in which they are found in Parc National des Ecrins, France. Additional research has found them to be hydrothermally altered basalt volcanic rocks that contain amygdules filled with white calcite and other secondary minerals.
