= Tachylite =

Form of basaltic volcanic glass

- Igneous rock
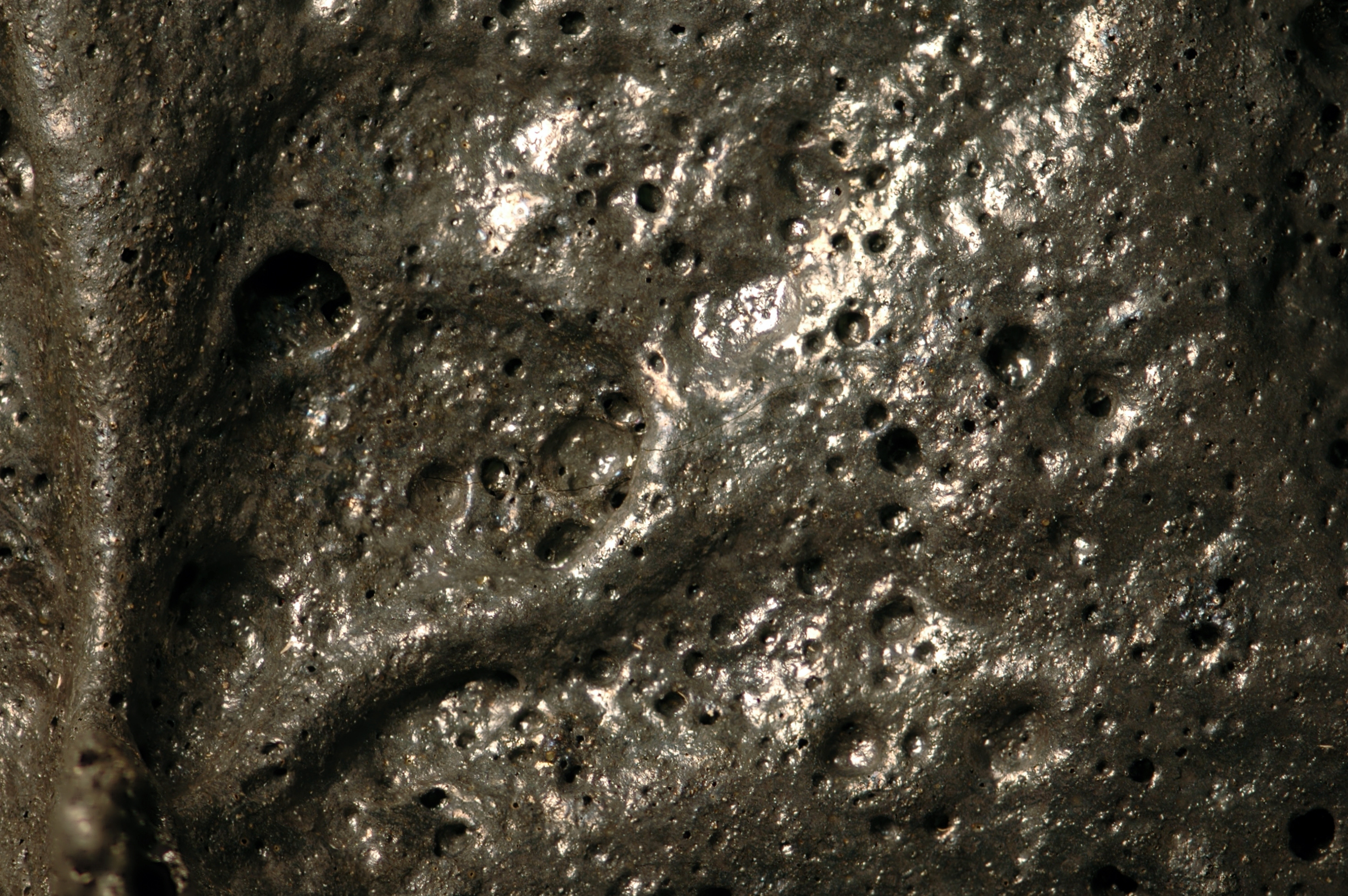
- Tachylite from Kīlauea volcano in Hawaii (view is about 9 cm across)

Composition
- Classification: Mafic
- Primary: Volcanic glass
- Secondary: Feldspar, olivine and magnetite
- Texture: Glassy or vesicular

Tachylite (/ˈtækəlaɪt/ TAK-ə-lyte; also spelled tachylyte) is a form of basaltic volcanic glass. This glass is formed naturally by the rapid cooling of mafic lava or magma. It is a type of mafic igneous rock that is decomposable by acids and readily fusible. The color is a black or dark-brown, and it has a greasy-looking, resinous luster. It is very brittle and occurs in dikes, veins, and intrusive masses. The word originates from the Ancient Greek ταχύς, meaning "swift".

Tachylites have the appearance of pitch and are often more or less vesicular and sometimes spherulitic. They are very brittle and break down readily under a hammer. Small crystals of feldspar or olivine are sometimes visible in them with the unaided eye. All tachylites weather rather easily and by oxidation of their iron become dark brown or red. Three modes of occurrence characterize this rock. In all cases they are found under conditions which imply rapid cooling, but they are much less common than acid volcanic glasses (or obsidians), the reason being apparently that the basic rocks have a stronger tendency to crystallize, partly because they are more liquid and the molecules have more freedom to arrange themselves in crystalline order.

Tachylite can be distinguished from obsidian and pitchstone by determining its fusibility, as splinters of tachylite will fuse together when heated.

== Geologic occurrences ==
=== Scoria sources ===
The fine scoria ashes or "cinders" thrown out by basaltic volcanoes are often spongy masses of tachylite with only a few larger crystals or phenocrysts imbedded in black glass. Such tachylite volcanic bombs and scoria are frequent in Iceland, Auvergne, Stromboli and Etna, and are very common also in the ash beds or tuffs of older date, such as occur in Skye, Midlothian and Fife, Derbyshire, and elsewhere. Basic pumices of this kind are exceedingly widespread on the bottom of the sea, either dispersed in the pelagic red clay and other deposits or forming layers coated with oxides of manganese precipitated on them from the sea water. These tachylite fragments, which are usually much decomposed by the oxidation and hydration of their ferrous compounds, have taken on a dark red color. This altered basic glass is known as "palagonite"; concentric bands of it often surround kernels of unaltered tachylite, and are so soft that they are easily cut with a knife. In the palagonite the minerals are also decomposed and are represented only by pseudomorphs. The fresh tachylite glass, however, often contains lozenge-shaped crystals of plagioclase feldspar and small prisms of augite and olivine, but all these minerals very frequently occur mainly as microlites or as skeletal growths with sharply-pointed corners or ramifying processes. Palagonite tuffs are found also among the older volcanic rocks. In Iceland a broad stretch of these rocks, described as "the palagonite formation," is said to cross the island from south-west to north-east. Some of these tuffs are fossiliferous; others are intercalated with glacial deposits. The lavas with which they occur are mostly olivine-basalts. Palagonite tuffs are found in Sicily, the Eifel, Hungary, Canary Islands, and other places.

=== Lava flow sources ===
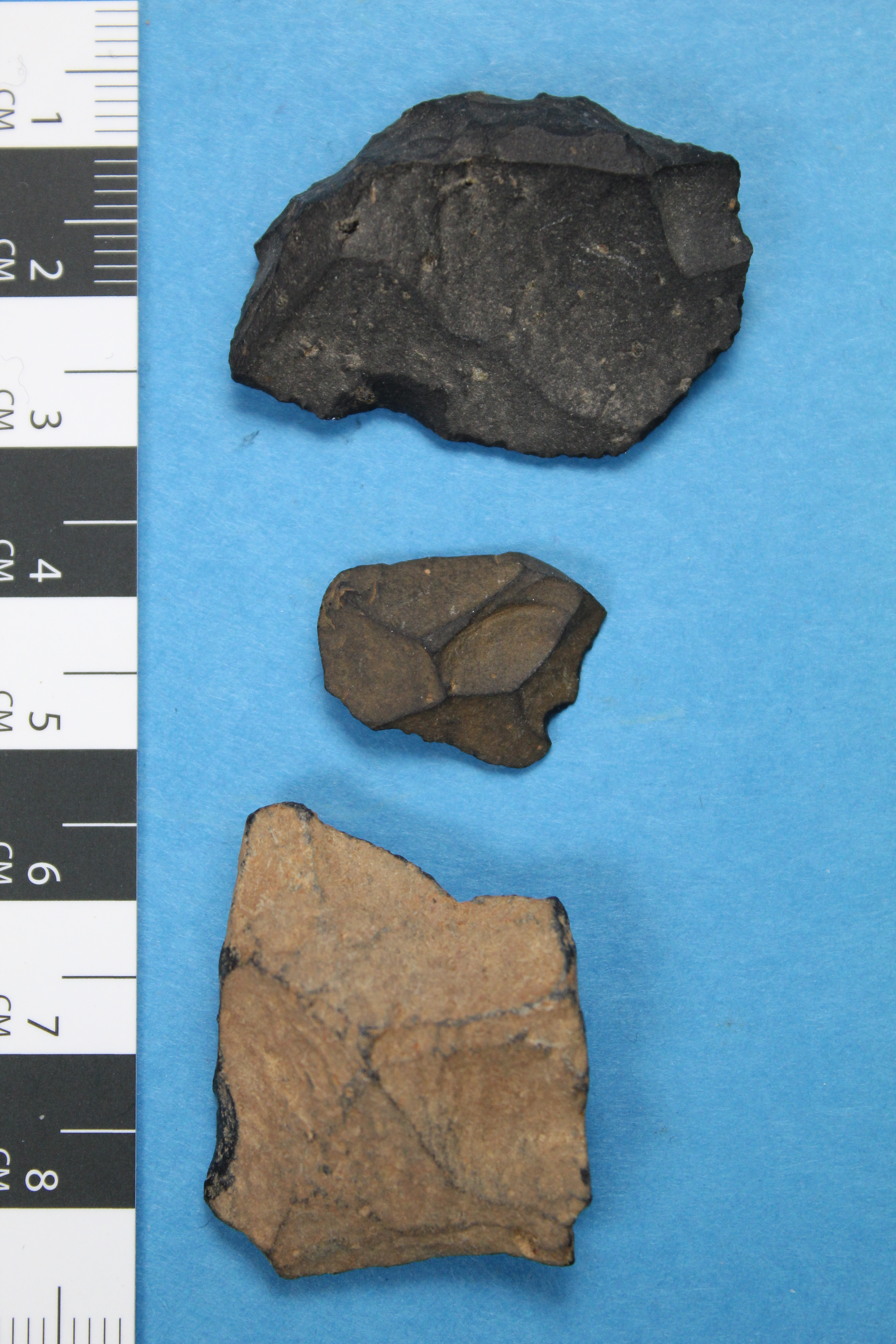
Flaked stone artefacts from Australia, made of tachylite

A second mode of occurrence of tachylite is in the form of lava flows. Basaltic rocks often contain a small amount of glassy ground-mass, and in the limburgites this becomes more important and conspicuous, but vitreous types are far less common in these than in the acid lavas.

Tachylite may form at the edge of sills or thin dikes of basalt or diabase that rapidly cooled. Such edges may be as little as a millimetre thick. It merges internally into crystalline basalt.

In the Hawaiian Islands, however, the volcanoes have poured out vast floods of black basalt, containing feldspar, augite, olivine, and iron ores in a black glassy base. They are highly liquid when discharged, and the rapid cooling that ensues on their emergence to the air prevents crystallization taking place completely. Many of them are spongy or vesicular, and their upper surfaces are often exceedingly rough and jagged, while at other times they assume rounded wave-like forms on solidification. Great caves are found where the crust has solidified and the liquid interior has subsequently flowed away, and stalactites and stalagmites of black tachylite adorn the roofs and floors. On section these growths show usually a central cavity enclosed by walls of dark brown glass in which skeletons and microliths of augite, olivine and feldspar lie imbedded. From the crater of Mt. Kilauea, thin clouds of steam rise constantly, and as the bubbles of vapor are liberated from the molten rock they carry into the air with them thin fibers of basalt that solidify at once and assume the form of tachylite threads. Under the microscope they prove to be nearly completely glassy with small circular air vesicles sometimes drawn out to long tubes. Only in the Hawaiian Islands are glassy basaltic lavas of this kind at all common. A small outcrop at Spring Hill in Victoria, Australia has tachylite which has been exploited as a material for making Aboriginal flaked stone implements.

=== Dike and sill sources ===
A third mode of occurrence of tachylite is as the margins and thin offshoots of dikes or sills of basalt and diabase. They are sometimes only a fraction of an inch in thickness, resembling a thin layer of pitch or tar on the edge of a crystalline diabase dike, but veins several inches thick are sometimes found. In these situations tachylite is rarely vesicular, but it often shows very pronounced fluxion banding accentuated by the presence of rows of spherulites that are visible as dark brown rounded spots. The spherulites have a distinct radiate structure and sometimes exhibit zones of varying color. The non-spherulitic glassy portion is sometimes perlitic, and these rocks are always brittle. Common crystals are olivine, augite and feldspar, with swarms of minute dusty black grains of magnetite. At the extreme edges the glass is often perfectly free from crystalline products, but it merges rapidly into the ordinary crystalline diabase, which in a very short distance may contain no vitreous base whatever. The spherulites may form the greater part of the mass, they may be a quarter of an inch in diameter and are occasionally much larger than this. These coarsely spherulitic rocks pass over into the variolites by increasing coarseness in the fibers of their spherulites, which soon become recognizable as needles of feldspar or feathery growths of augite. The ultimate product of decomposition in this case also is a red palagonitic substance, but owing to the absence of steam cavities the tachylite selvages of dikes are more often found in a fresh state than the basic lapilli in ash-beds. Many occurrences of basaltic pitchstones have been reported from Skye, Mull, and the western part of Scotland; they are found also in connection with the intrusive diabase sills in the north of England and the center of Scotland. In the Saar district of Germany similar rocks occur, some of which have been described as weiselbergites (from Weiselberg).

Other localities for tachylites of this group are New Providence, Silesia and Sweden.

== See also ==
- Pseudotachylite – Glassy or very fine-grained type of rock
- Vitrophyre – Glassy volcanic rock
