= Porphyroblast =

Large mineral crystal in a metamorphic rock

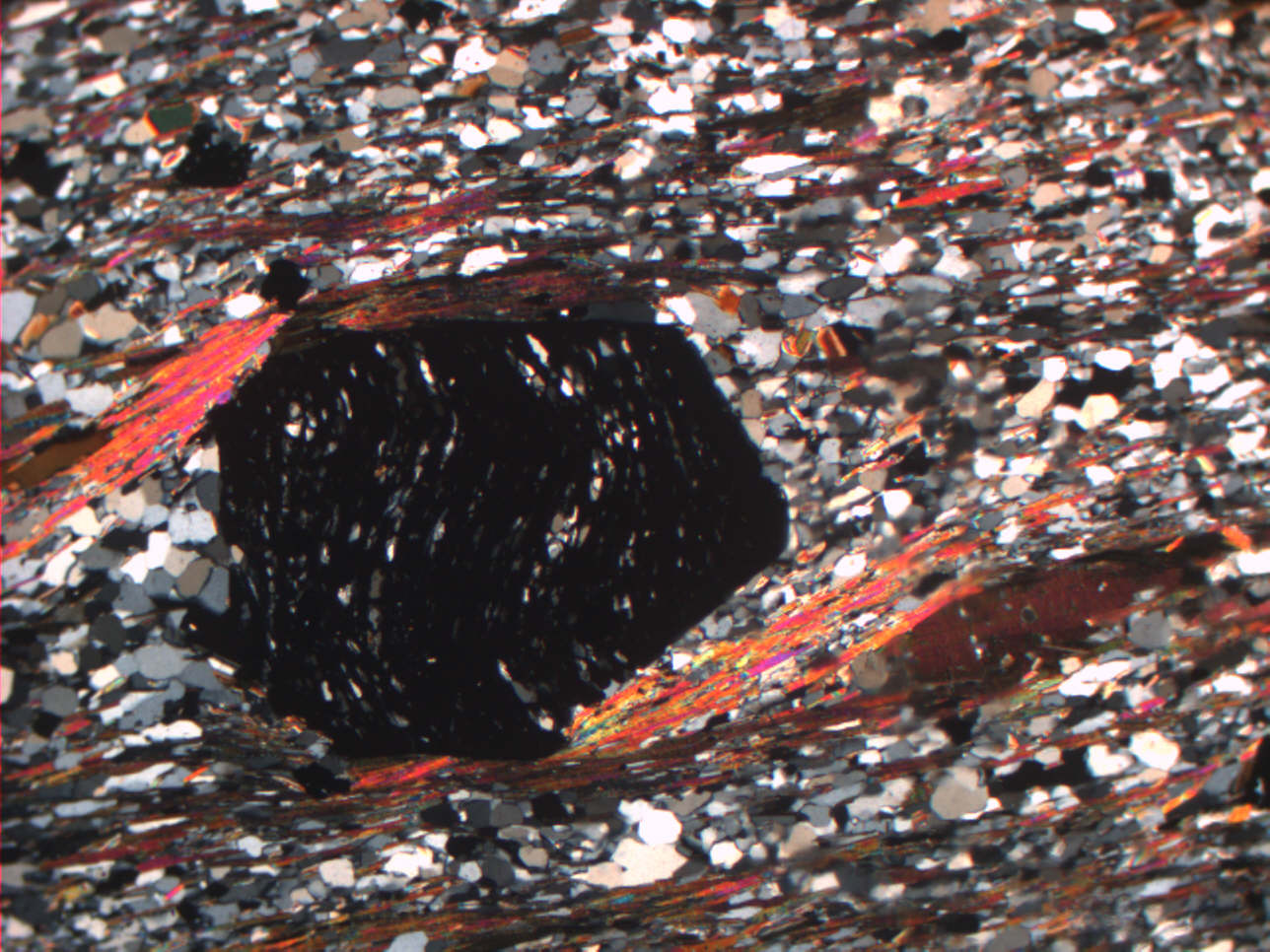
Thin section of a garnet porphyroblast (black) in a mica schist that contains foliated trails of small inclusions (white and grey)

A porphyroblast is a large mineral crystal in a metamorphic rock which has grown within the finer grained matrix. Porphyroblasts are commonly euhedral crystals, but can also be partly to completely irregular in shape.

The most common porphyroblasts in metapelites (metamorphosed mudstones and siltstones) are garnets and staurolites, which stand out in well-foliated metapelites (such as schists) against the platy mica matrix.

A similar type of crystal is a phenocryst, a large crystal in an igneous rock. Porphyroblasts are often confused with porphyroclasts, which can also be large outstanding crystals, but which are older than the matrix of the rock.

If a porphyroblastic mineral has small inclusions of minerals within it, the mineral is described as poikiloblastic. This observation can help interpret deformation history.

A rock which has many porphyroblasts is described as having a porphyroblastic texture.

As porphyroblasts grow, the foliation may be preserved as oriented inclusions trapped by the porphyroblast as it overgrows them, and this is helpful for tracking changing deformation planes.

In metamorphic rocks that experience deformation during metamorphism, porphyroblasts may grow before, during, or after the phase of deformation recorded by the matrix minerals. The relationship of porphyroblast growth to deformation is typically evaluated by comparing the shape orientation of trails of mineral inclusions in the porphyroblast to the matrix fabric.

Some garnet porphyroblasts contain curving trails of quartz and other mineral inclusions that record rotation of the crystals relative to their surroundings. However, the question of how much porphyroblasts actually rotate in an external reference frame fixed to the Earth's surface during metamorphism and deformation has long been the subject of debate. The question focused on so-called "spiral garnets", also known as "snowball garnets", whose inclusion trails define spiral patterns. These microstructures are interpreted classically as having formed by shearing induced rotation of a growing garnet crystal. Later research, however, led to an alternative formation model in which a porphyroblast grows over a developing microfold while maintaining a stable position in the external reference frame. Repetition of this process can then produce complex spiral-shaped patterns. Although many researchers continue to adopt the classic rotational model, most researchers who have published research testing both models by measuring the orientations of porphyroblasts have come to support the modern interpretation.

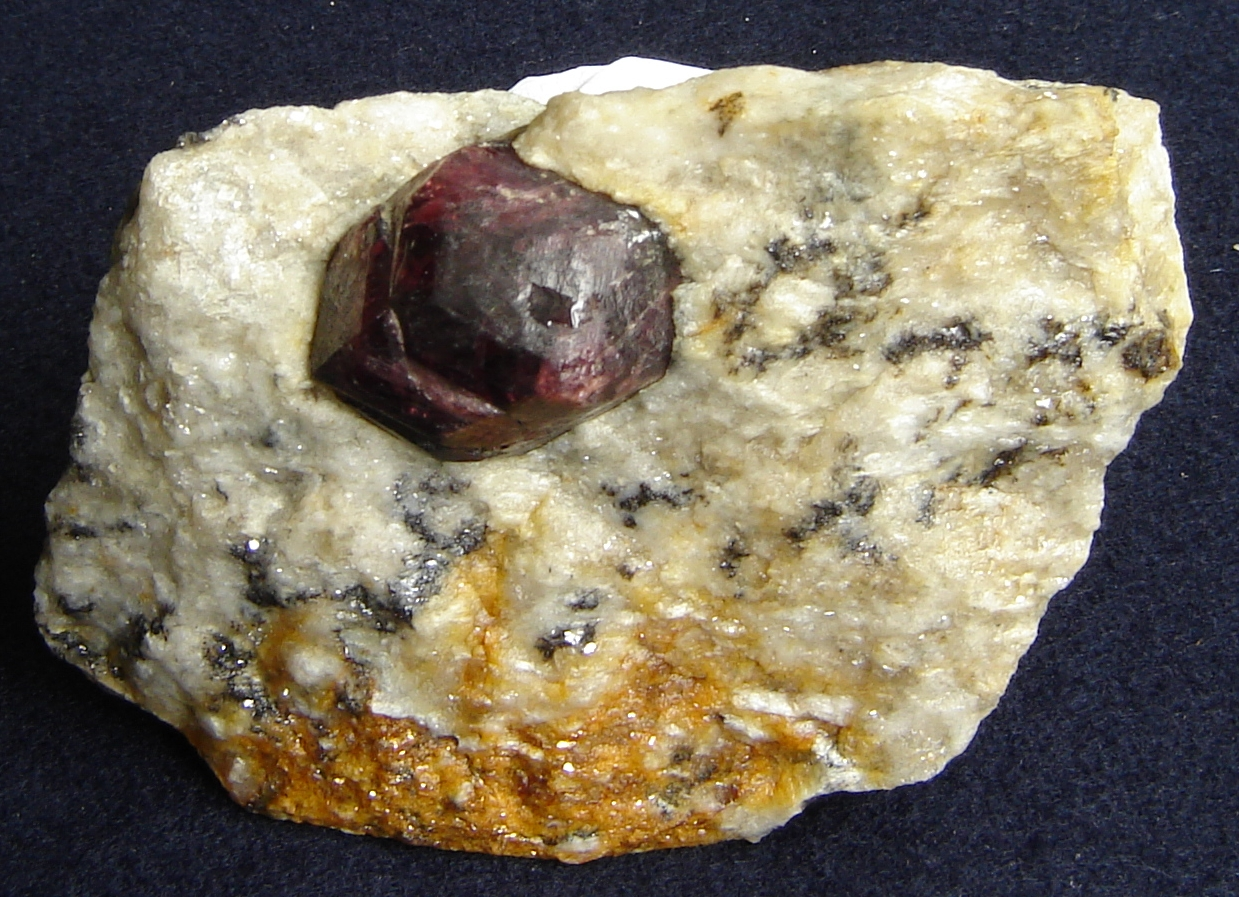
An almandine-garnet growing as a porphyroblast in a quartzitic gneiss

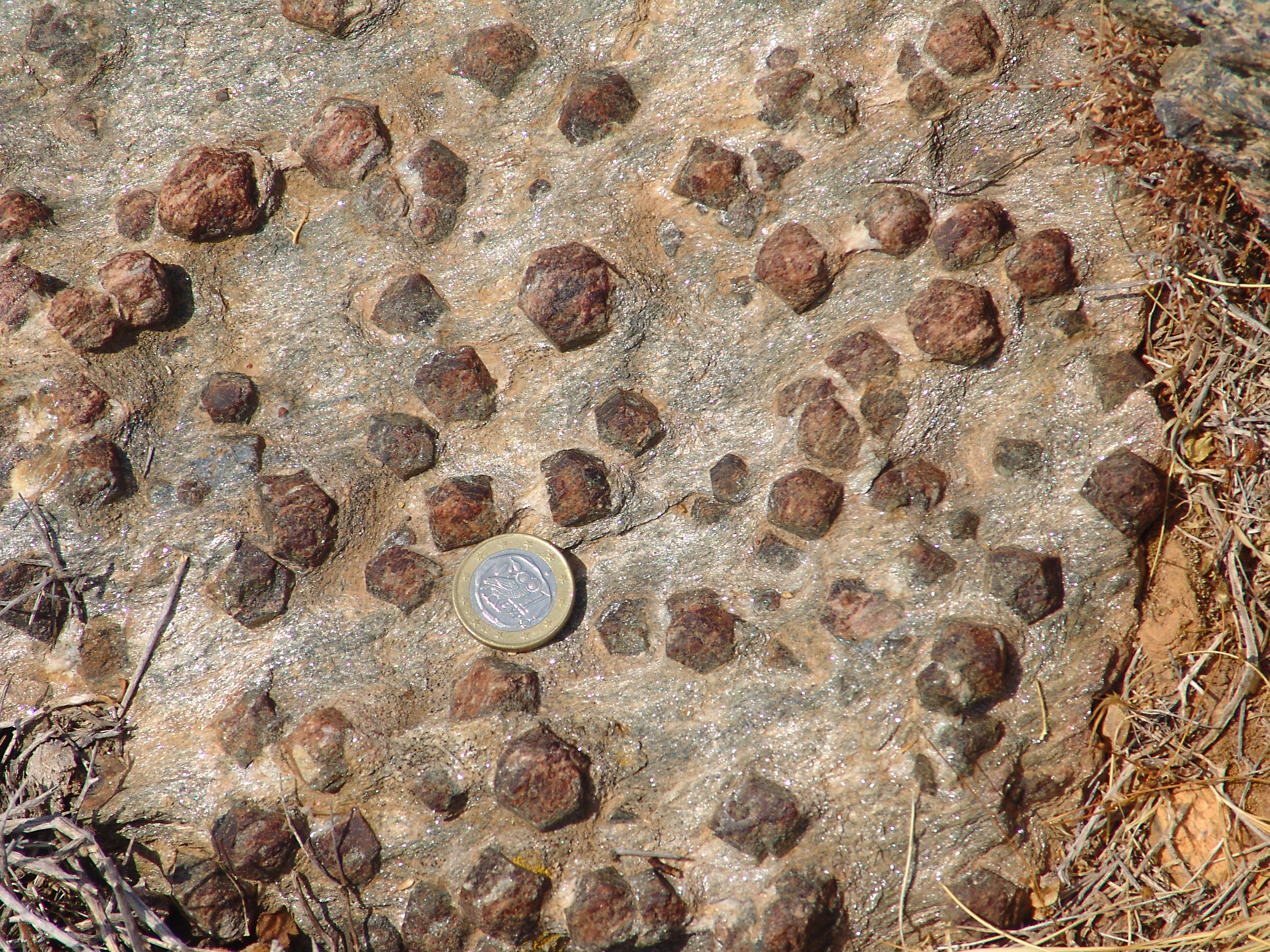
Dark-coloured porphyroblasts of garnet in mica schist at Syros, Greece

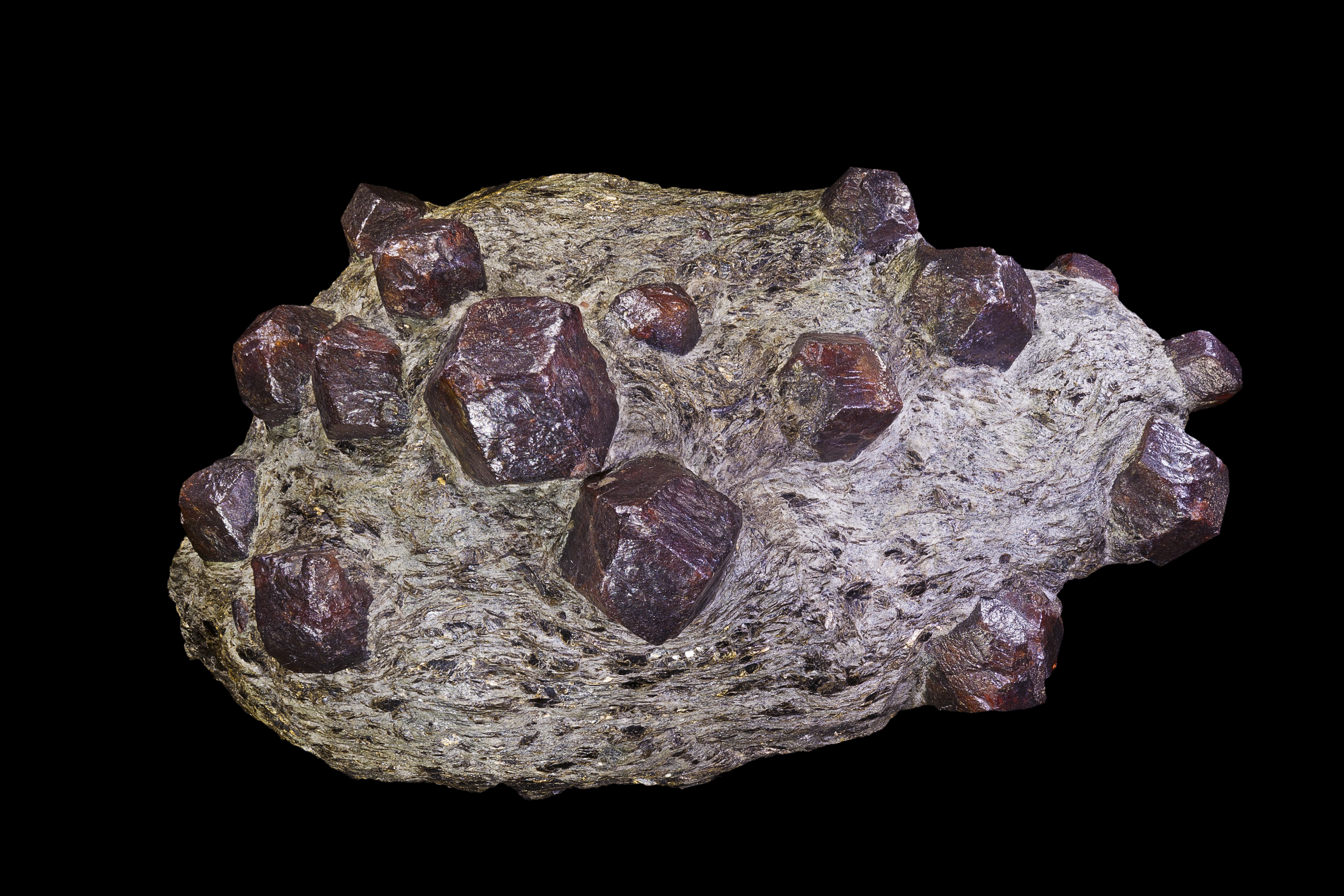
Large almandine porphyroblasts growing in gray-green schist

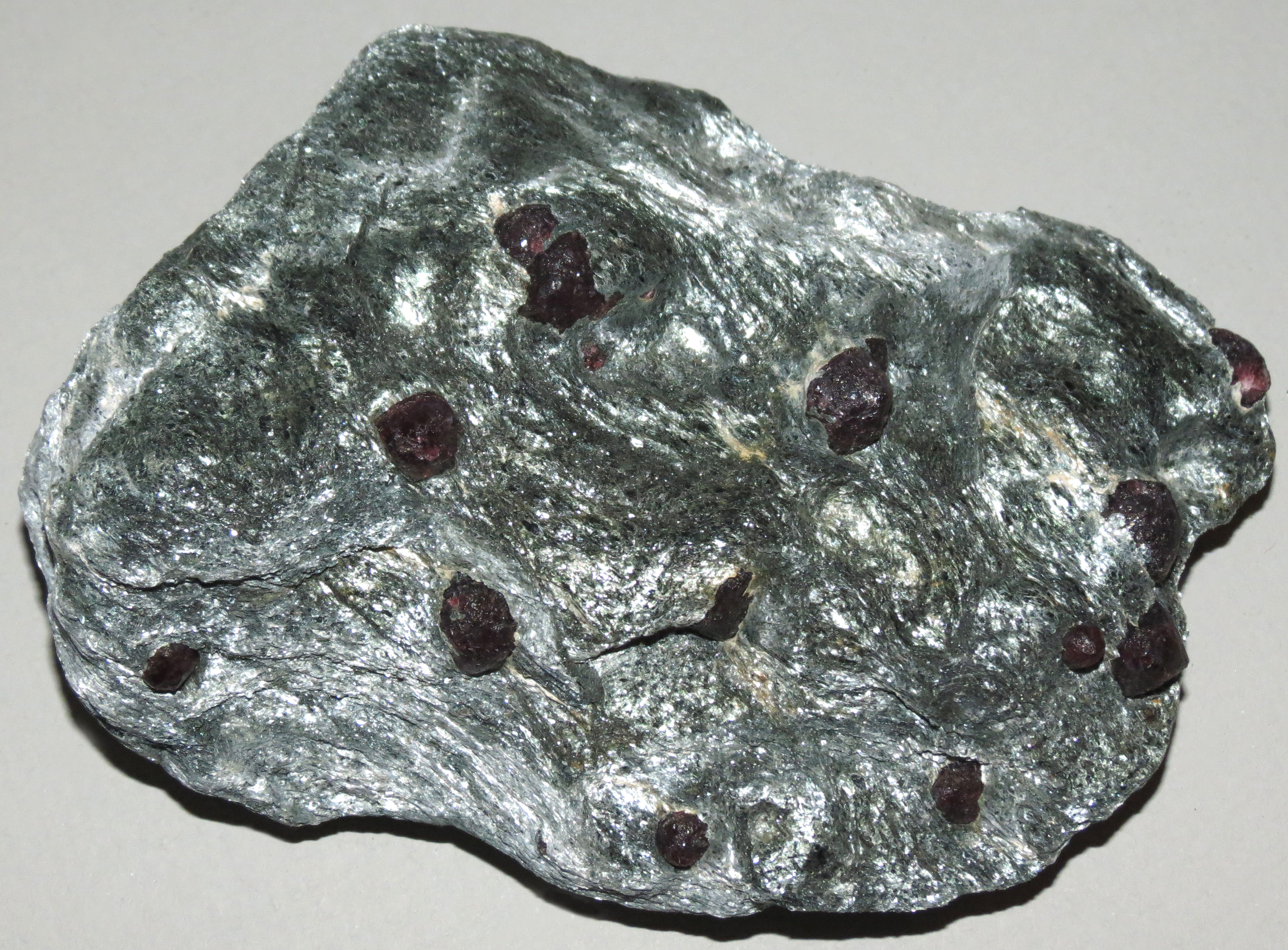
Garnet porphyroblasts in schist featuring the deflection of the foliation around their space

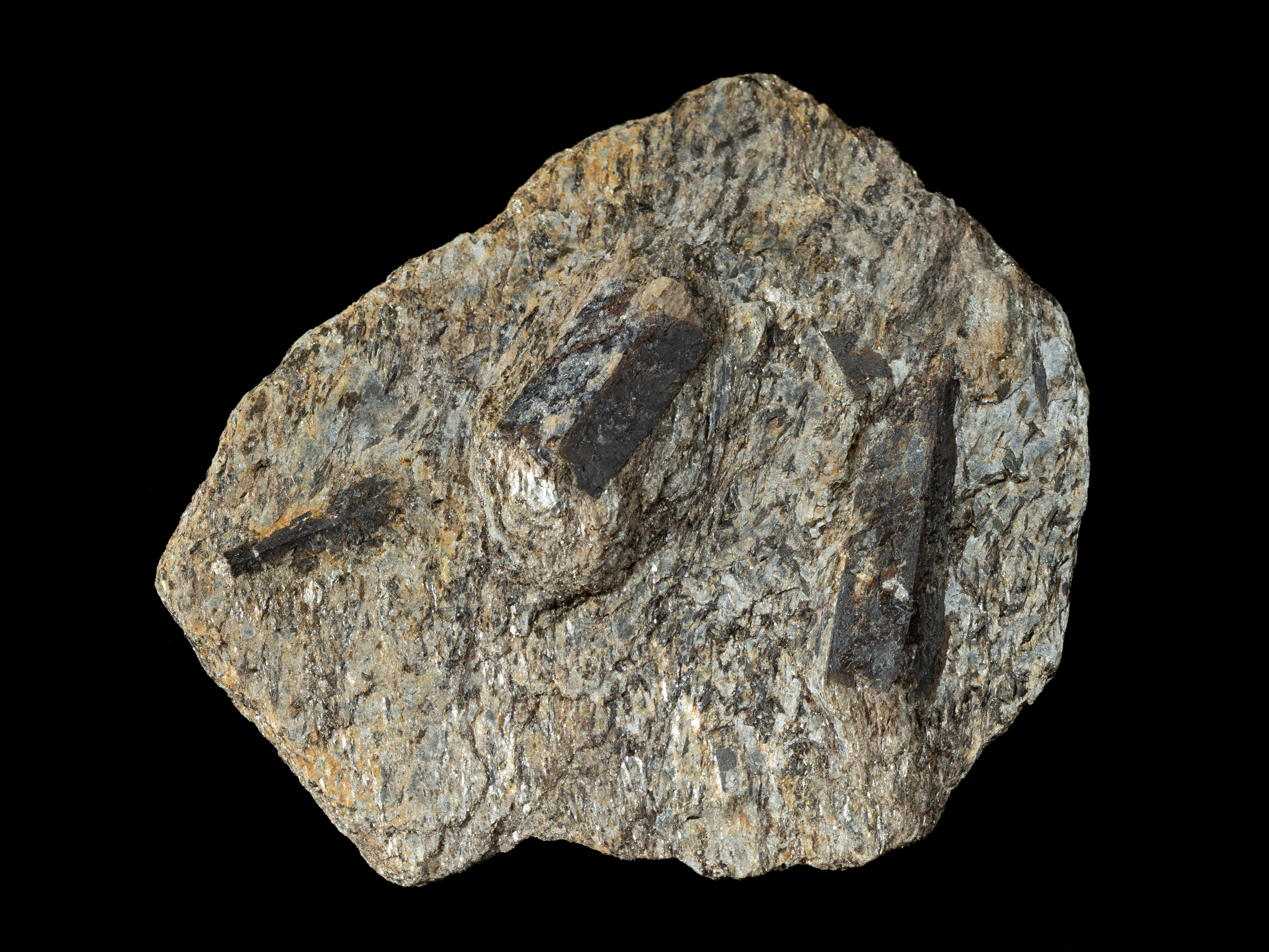
Staurolite growing as porphyroblasts in a mica schist

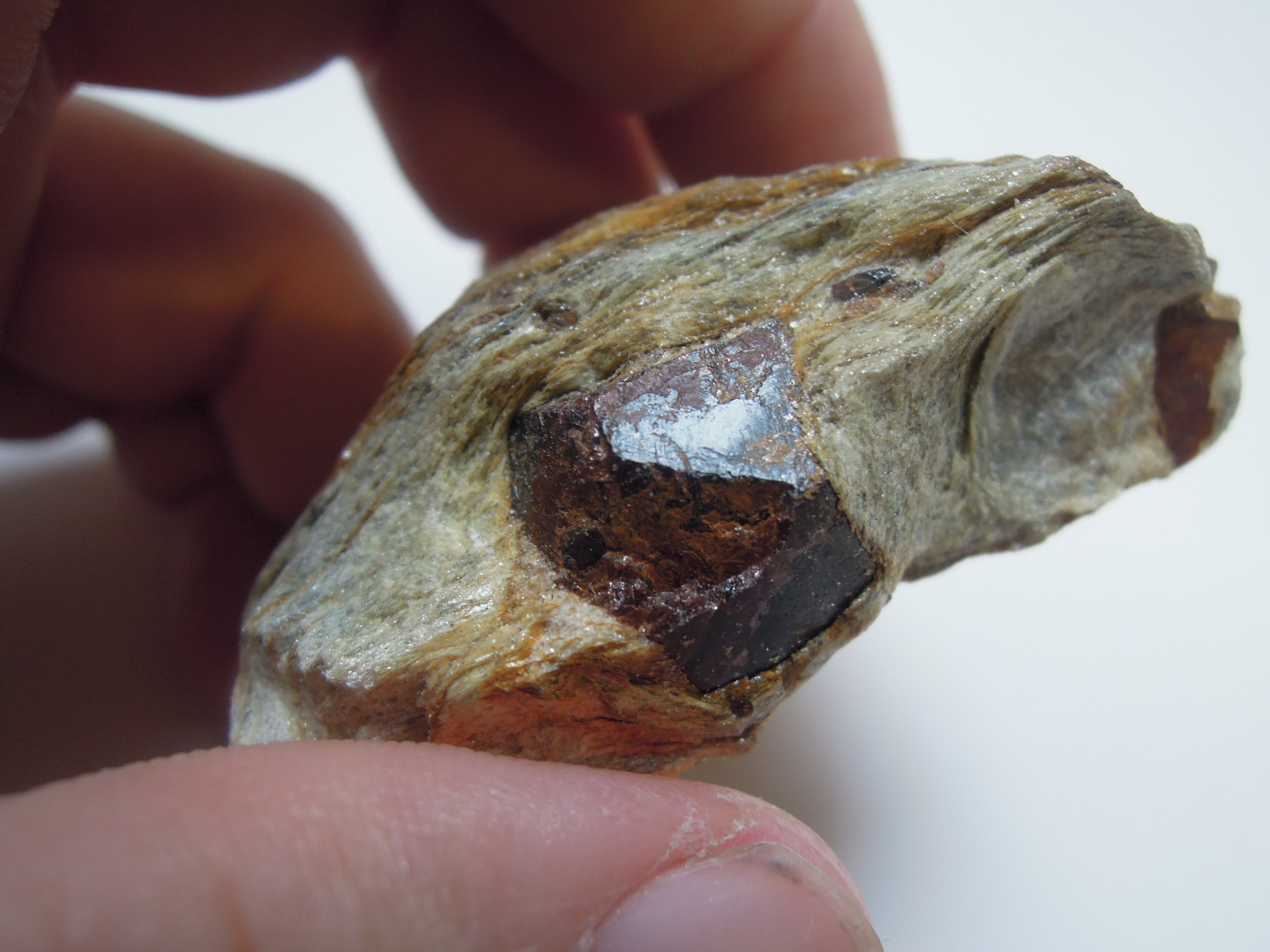
Almandine porphyroblast in a schist, showcasing the curved trail of the surrounding matrix

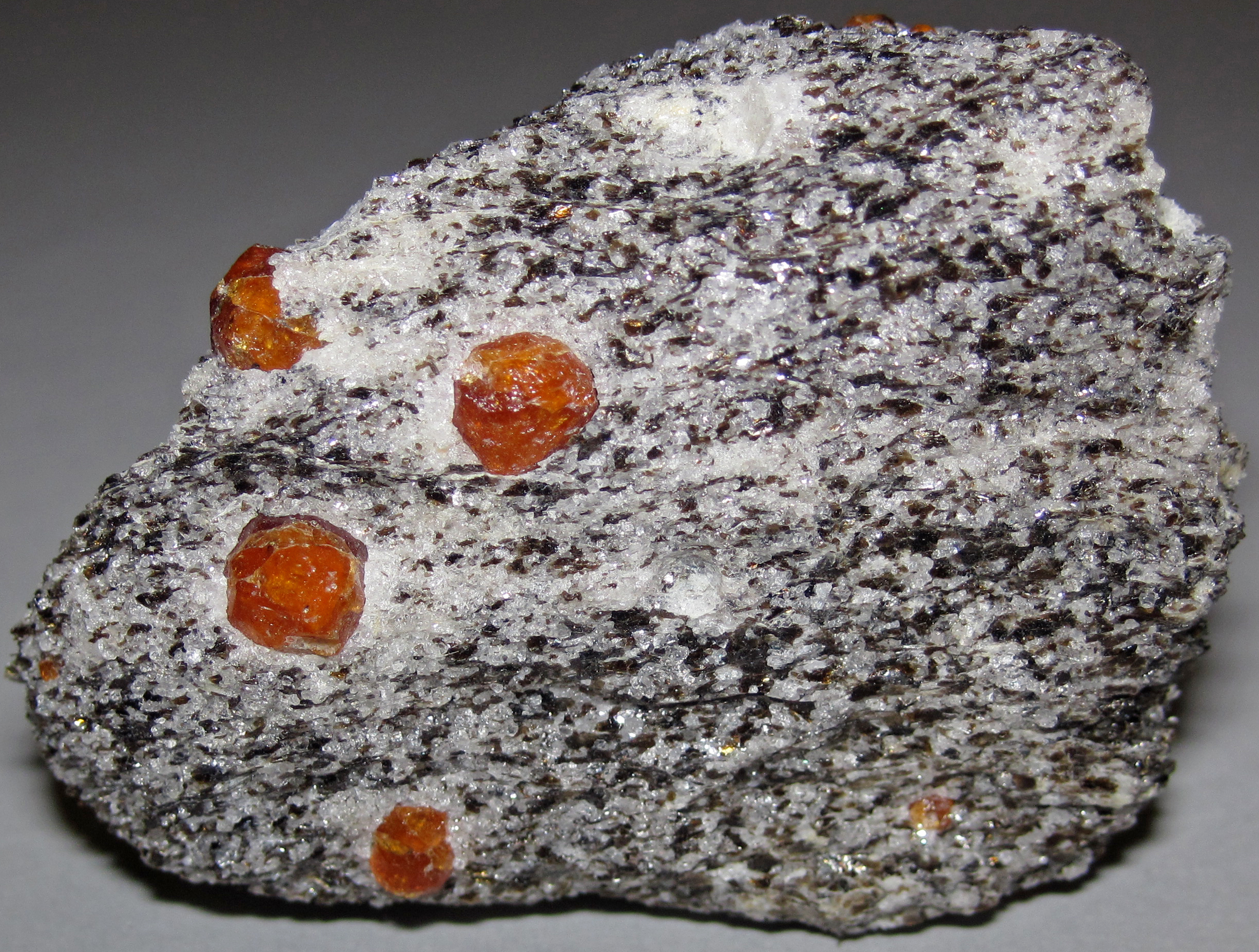
Spessartine porphyroblasts in schist

== See also ==
- List of rock textures
- Rock microstructure
