= William Henry Gill (ethnographer) =

Australian ethnographer

William Henry Gill (1861–1944) was an Australian ethnographer, collector of Aboriginal artefacts, and art dealer.

== Ethnographic activities ==
Gill was prolific in recording information about Australian Aboriginal culture and artefacts in Tasmania and mainland Australia. His papers were compiled by the Mitchell Library and constitute an important early ethnographic record.

He was particularly concerned with the customs of Aboriginal people of the Dieri, Wonkonguru and Yaurorka tribes of the Lake Eyre region of South Australia and corresponded with George Aiston, a police officer stationed to the north and east of Lake Eyre, Central Australia. He also corresponded with C. L. Willes about early Tasmanian records and Tasmanian aborigines and with Daisy Bates.

== Art dealer ==
Gill also ran a business as a fine art dealer, with connections to artists including Norman Lindsay, George Washington Lambert, Tom Roberts and Arthur Streeton. He ran the Fine Art Society, in Melbourne, Victoria, initially as a department of the firm of Robertson & Moffat, and in 1912 he established his own gallery in Alfred Place, later moving to 100 Exhibition Street in 1920. The gallery closed in 1940. Some of the stone artefacts Gill collected from Lake Eyre were later acquired from J G Turner by the British Museum in 1946.

== Publications ==
- The Working Stone Tools of the Wonkonguru Aboriginal Tribe of lake Eyre County Central Australia 1926–1930
