= Porphyroclast =

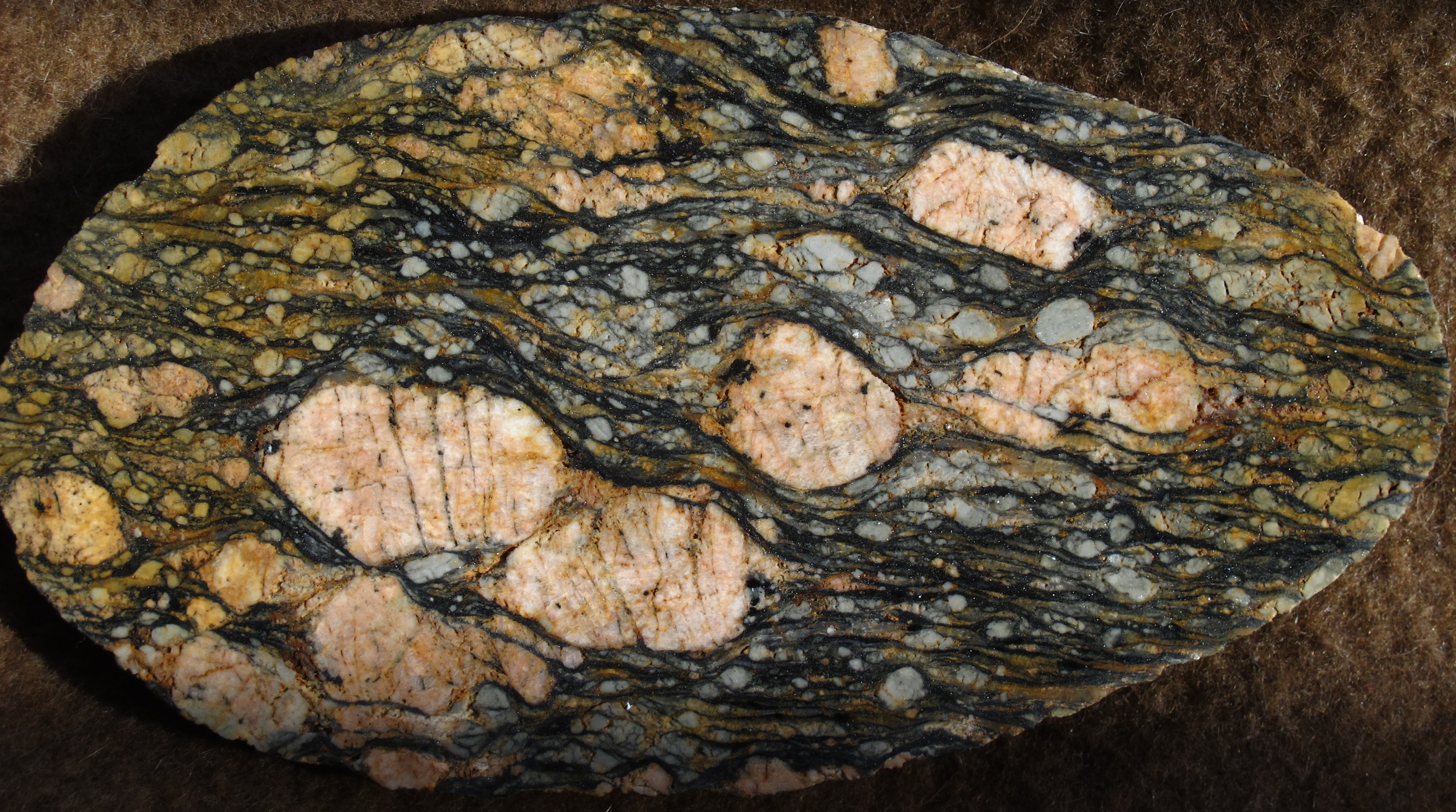
Augen mylonite from near Røragen, Norway. This deformed megacrystic granite has large alkali felspar and small plagioclase feldspar porphyroclasts. Sample 18 cm x 10 cm. Many of the larger porphyroclasts have a clear σ-type geometry, consistent with top to the right shear sense.

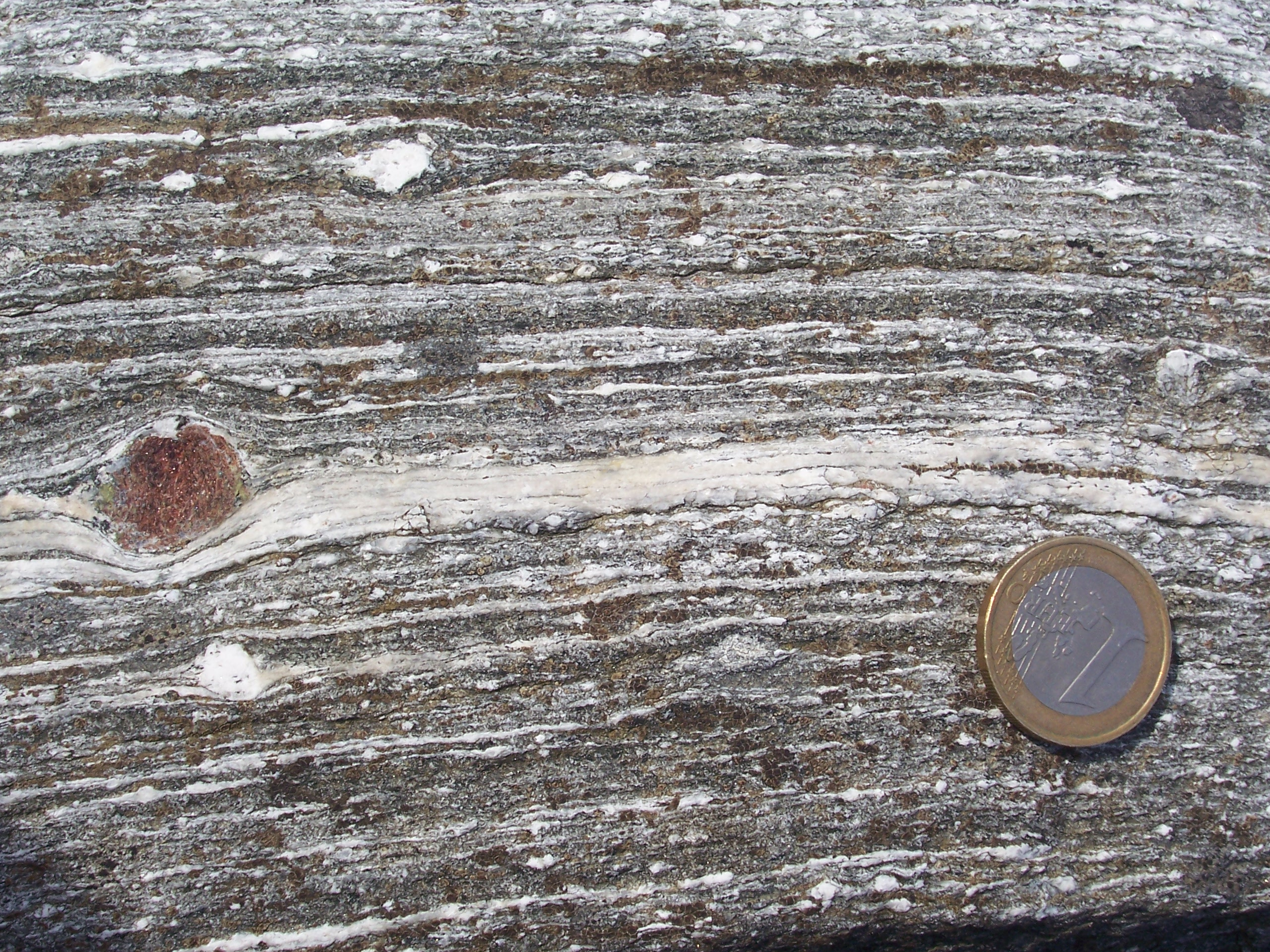
A mylonite showing a number of (rotated) porphyroclasts: a clear red garnet left in the picture while smaller white feldspar porphyroclasts can be found all over. Location: the tectonic contact between the autochthonous Western Gneiss Region and rocks of the allochthonous Blåhø nappe on Otrøy, Caledonides, Central Norway.

A porphyroclast is a clast or mineral fragment in a metamorphic rock, surrounded by a groundmass of finer grained crystals. Porphyroclasts are fragments of the original rock before dynamic recrystallisation or cataclasis produced the groundmass. This means they are older than the groundmass. They were stronger pieces of the original rock, that could not deform as easily and were therefore not or minimally affected by recrystallisation. They may have been phenocrysts or porphyroblasts in the original rock.

Porphyroclasts are often confused with porphyroblasts. The latter are also large crystals in a finer matrix, but they grew during, or after deformation took place and during or after the matrix was formed. The timing of porphyroblast growth can be determined by examining the microstructure preserved (or not) within them as poikiloblasts.

In strongly deformed rocks porphyroclasts are often rotated by the shear stress in the rock. Their shape can be used to determine the direction of the shear.

== Porphyroclast systems ==
Where porphyroclasts have rims made of finer grained crystals, they are referred to as porphyroclast systems. The geometries of porphyroclast systems can be used to determine the sense of shear within a shear zone.
