= Granofels =

Granofels is a term referring to medium- to coarse-grained metamorphic rocks which have a granoblastic texture (having poorly formed, equi-granular crystal grains visible to the naked eye) and lack distinct foliation or lineation. The granofels term encompasses rocks which are known under more specific names, such as marble or hornfels.
