= Poikilitic texture =

Feature of some igneous rocks

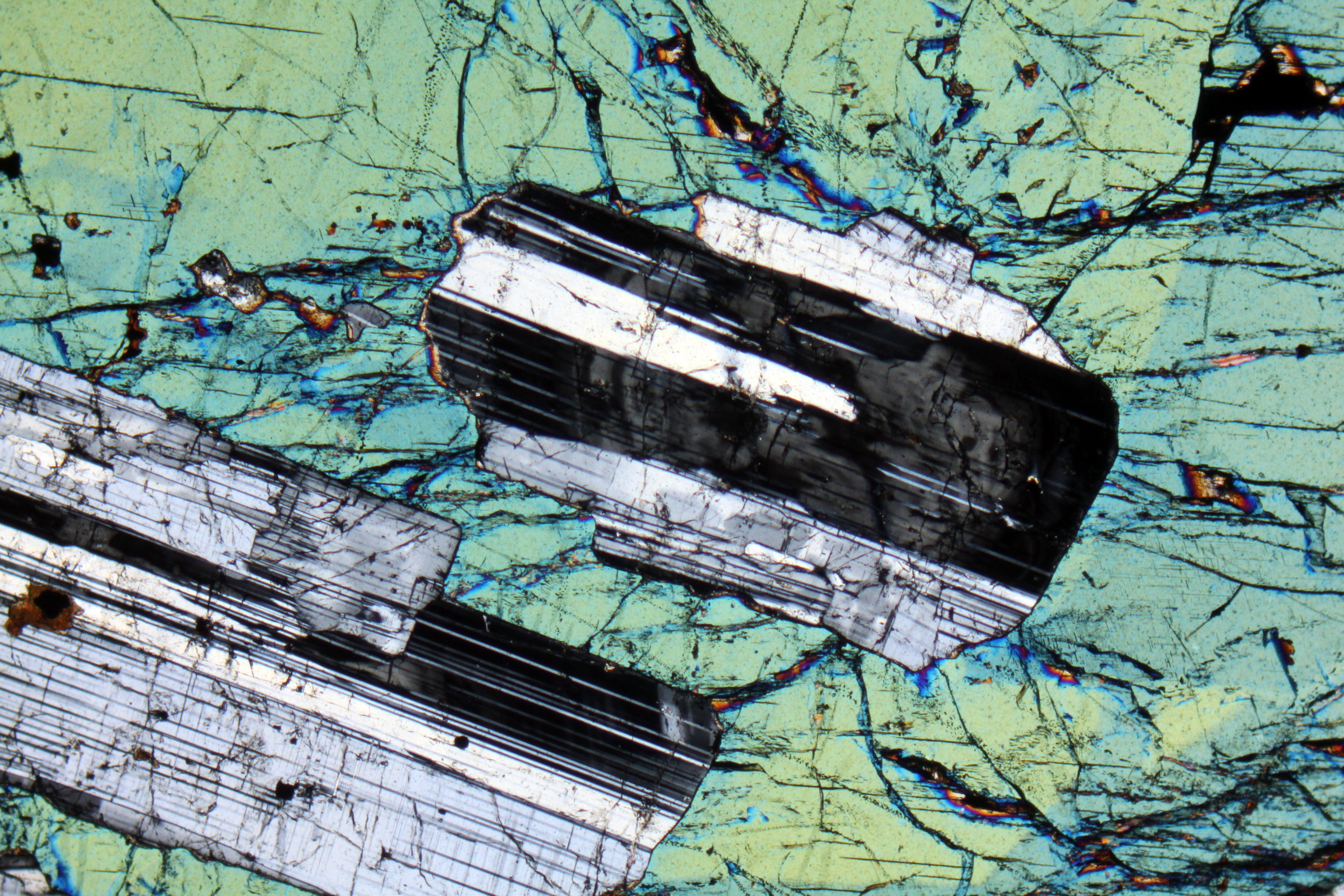
Ophitic texture between an augite (blue-green) oikocryst surrounding smaller plagioclase (black and white) chadacrysts

Poikilitic texture refers to igneous rocks where large later-formed less perfect crystals ('oikocrysts') surround smaller early-formed idiomorphic crystals ('chadacrysts') of other minerals. A poikilitic texture is most easily observed in petrographic thin sections.

In some rocks there seems to be little tendency for the minerals to envelop one another. This is true of many gabbros, aplites and granites. The grains then lie side by side, with the faces of the latter moulded on or adapted to the more perfect crystalline outlines of the earlier.

== Ophitic ==
A variety of poikilitic texture, known as ophitic texture, is where laths of plagioclase are enclosed in pyroxene, olivine or other minerals. It is very characteristic of many diabases, in which large crystals of augite enclose smaller laths of plagioclase feldspar. Biotite and hornblende frequently enclose feldspar ophitically; less commonly iron oxides and sphene do so. In peridotites the "lustre-mottled" structure arises from pyroxene or hornblende enveloping olivine in the same manner. In these cases no crystallographic relation exists between the two minerals (enclosing and enclosed).

== See also ==
- List of rock textures
- Poikiloblast
