= Spherulite =

Bodies that commonly occur in vitreous igneous rocks

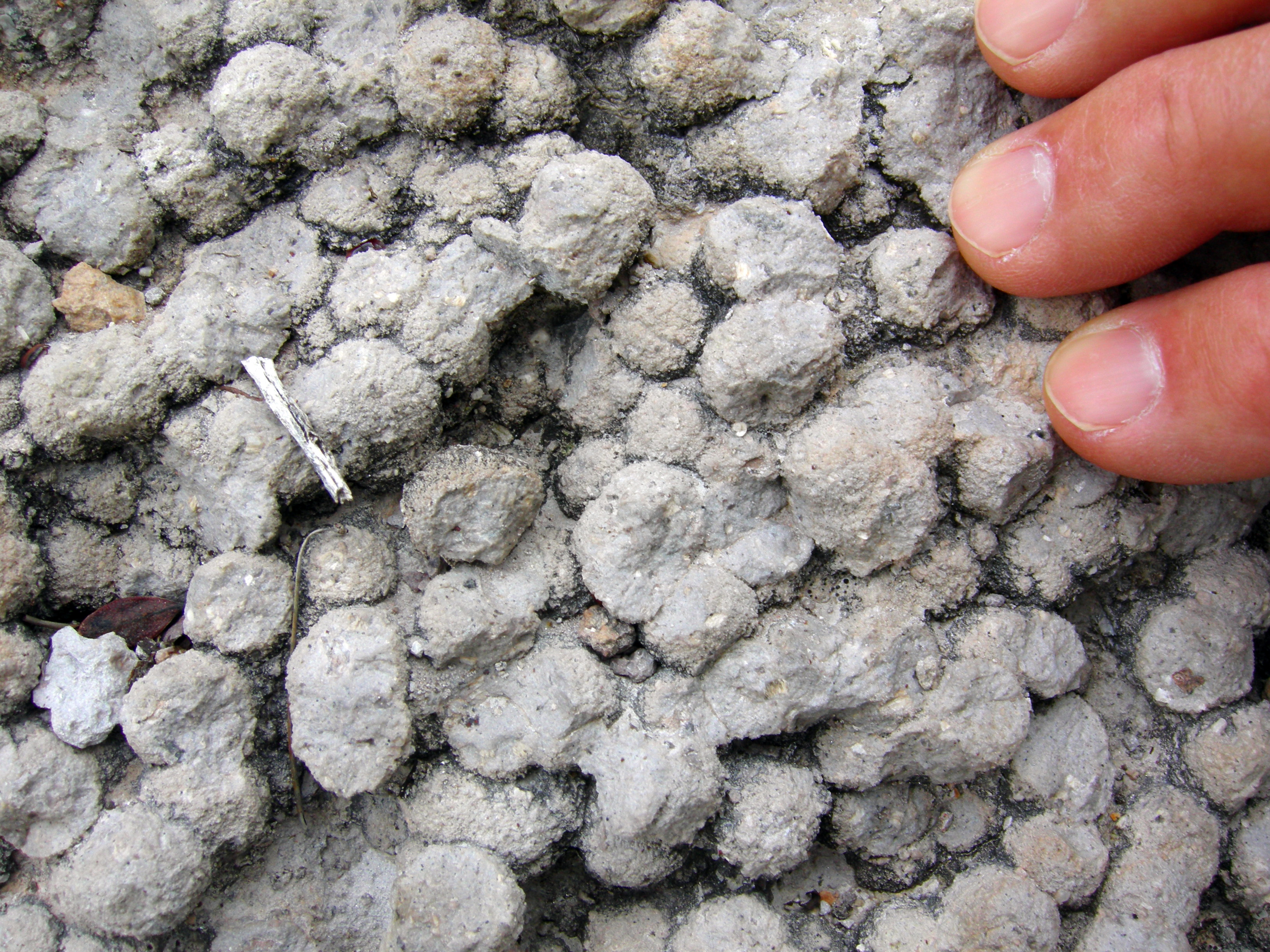
Spherulites in rhyolitic ash, Hailstone Trail, Echo Canyon, Chiricahua Mountains, Arizona

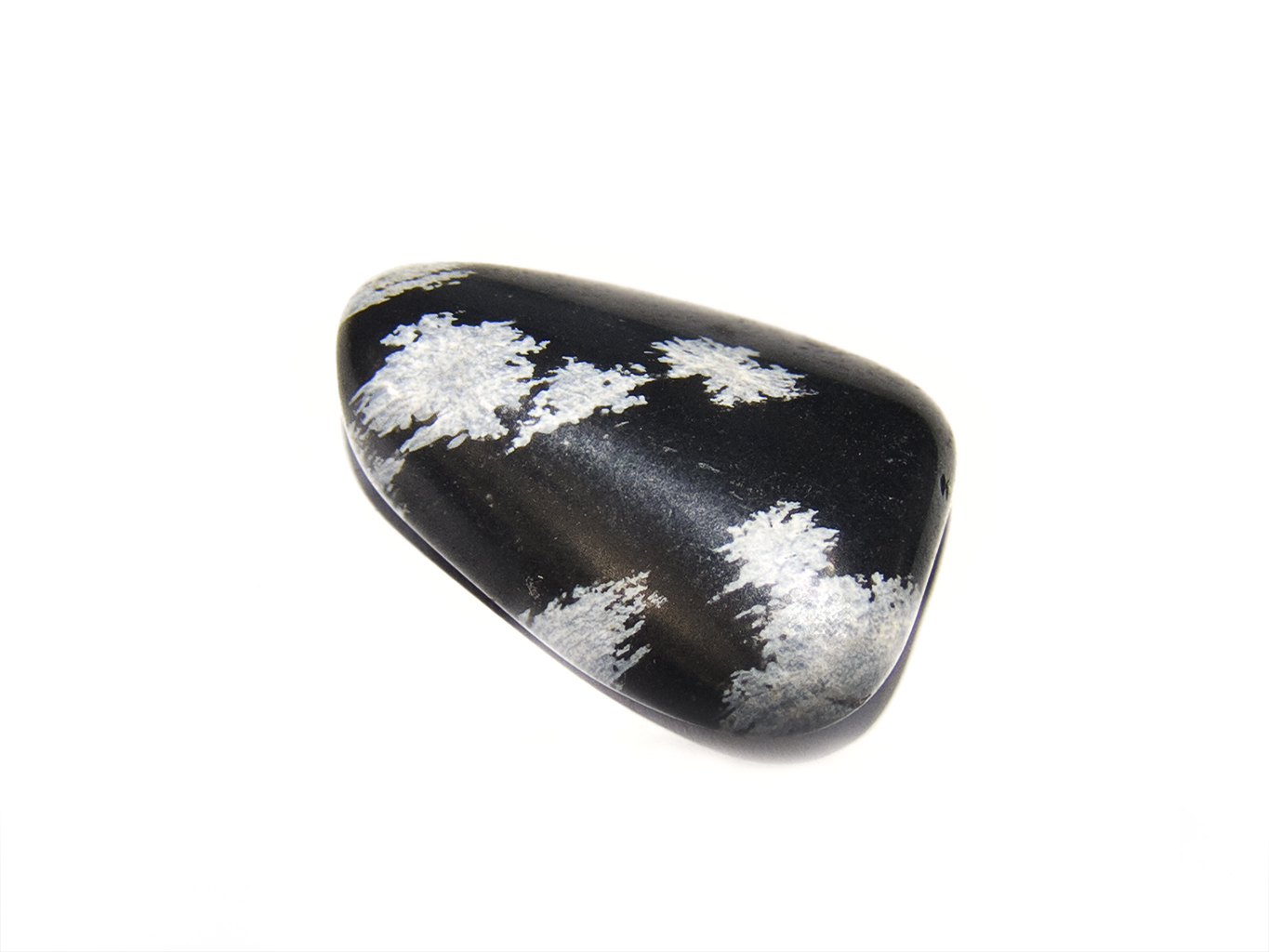
Spherulite markings on snowflake obsidian

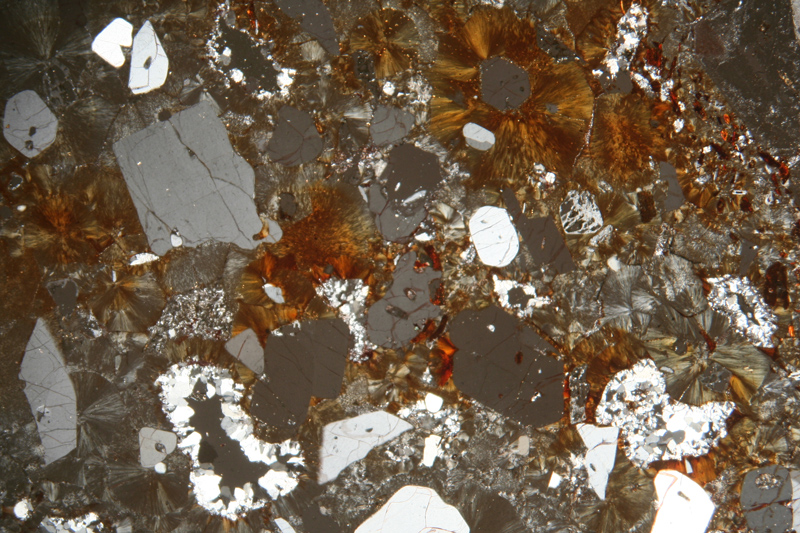
Photomicrograph of rhyolite, showing spherulitic texture (brown, between grey to white crystals)

In petrology, spherulites (/ˈsfɛrʊlaɪts, sfɪər-/) are small, rounded bodies that commonly occur in vitreous igneous rocks. They are often visible in specimens of obsidian, pitchstone, and rhyolite as globules about the size of millet seed or rice grain, with a duller luster than the surrounding glassy base of the rock, and when they are examined with a lens they prove to have a radiate fibrous structure.

== Structure ==
Under the microscope the spherulites are of circular outline and are composed of thin divergent fibers that are crystalline as verified with polarized light. Between crossed Nicols, a black cross appears in the spherulite; its axes are usually perpendicular to one another and parallel to the crosshairs; as the microscope stage is rotated the cross remains steady; between the black arms there are four bright sectors. This shows that the spherulite consists of radiate, doubly refracting fibers that have a straight extinction; the arms of the black cross correspond to those fibers that are extinguished. The aggregate is too fine-grained to directly determine what minerals it is composed of using visible light microscopy.

== Occurrence ==
Spherulites are most common in silica-rich glassy rocks. Sometimes they compose the whole mass; more usually they are surrounded by a glassy or felsitic base. When obsidians are devitrified, the spherulites are often traceable, though they may be more or less completely recrystallized or silicified. In the center of a spherulite there may be a crystal (e.g. quartz or feldspar) or sometimes a cavity. Occasionally spherulites have zones of different colors, and while most frequently spherical, they may also be polygonal or irregular in outline. In some New Zealand rhyolites the spherulites send branching cervicorn processes (like stags horns) outwards through the surrounding glass of the rock. The name axiolites is given to long, elliptical or band-like spherulites.

== Megaspherulites ==
Occasionally spherulites are found that are many centimeters and, even more rarely, up to two or three meters in diameter. Those spherulites, which are more than 20 centimeters in diameter, are called megaspherulites. Near Silver Cliff, Colorado, megaspherulites, which range in diameter from 0.30 to 4.3 meters occur within a thick layer of rhyolitic vitrophyre. Megaspherulites as large as 0.91 meter occur within rhyolite exposures on Steens Mountain, Oregon and ones as large as 1.83 meters in diameter occur within welded tuffs exposed near Klondyke, Arizona. The best known occurrence of megaspherulites are stone balls, which range in diameter from 0.61 to 3.35 meters, found around Cerro Piedras Bola in the Sierra de Ameca between Ahualulco de Mercado and Ameca, Jalisco. As often happens with considerably smaller spherulites, these megaspherulites have been released by weathering from an ash flow tuff, in which they originally formed, to create natural stone balls.

== Lithophysae ==
Very large and cavernous spherulites are called lithophysae; they are found in obsidians at Lipari, in Yellowstone Park and other places. The characteristic radiate fibrous structure is usually conspicuous, but the fibers are interrupted by cavities that are often arranged as to give the spherulite a resemblance to a rosebud with folded petals separated by arching interspaces. Some of these lithophysae are several centimeters or more in diameter. Tridymite, fayalite and other minerals in the lithophysae may be precipitates from the vapor phase that occupied the cavities. The fibers of these coarse spherulites are alkali feldspar (sanidine or anorthoclase) and tridymite.

== Artificial glass ==
Artificial glass sometimes crystallizes and contains spherulites that may be as large as a marble. As the glass has little similarity in chemical composition to volcanic obsidians, these spherulites when analyzed throw little light on the mineral nature of spherulites in rocks. They show, however, that in viscous semi-solid glasses near their fusion point crystallization tends to nucleate at certain centers and to spread outwards, producing spherulitic structures. Many salts and organic substances exhibit the same tendency, yielding beautiful spherulite crystallizations when melted and cooled rapidly on a microscopic slide.

== Variolites ==
Variolites are a type of radiate fibrous growth, resembling spherulites in many respects, consisting of minute feathery crystals spreading outwards through a fine grained or glassy rock. In variolites there are straight or feathery feldspar crystals (usually oligoclase) forming pale-colored spherulites a quarter to half an inch in diameter. The same rocks often contain similar aggregates of plumose skeleton crystals of augite. Many volcanic rocks have small lath-shaped crystals of feldspar or augite diverging from a common center.
