= Poikiloblast =

A poikiloblast is a porphyroblast mineral with small inclusions of the previous rock in it. From the texture (if any) shown in the inclusion, the deformation history of the rock can be interpreted, as the inclusions are always older than the porphyroblast.
