= Yorkstone =

Variety of sandstone from Yorkshire, England

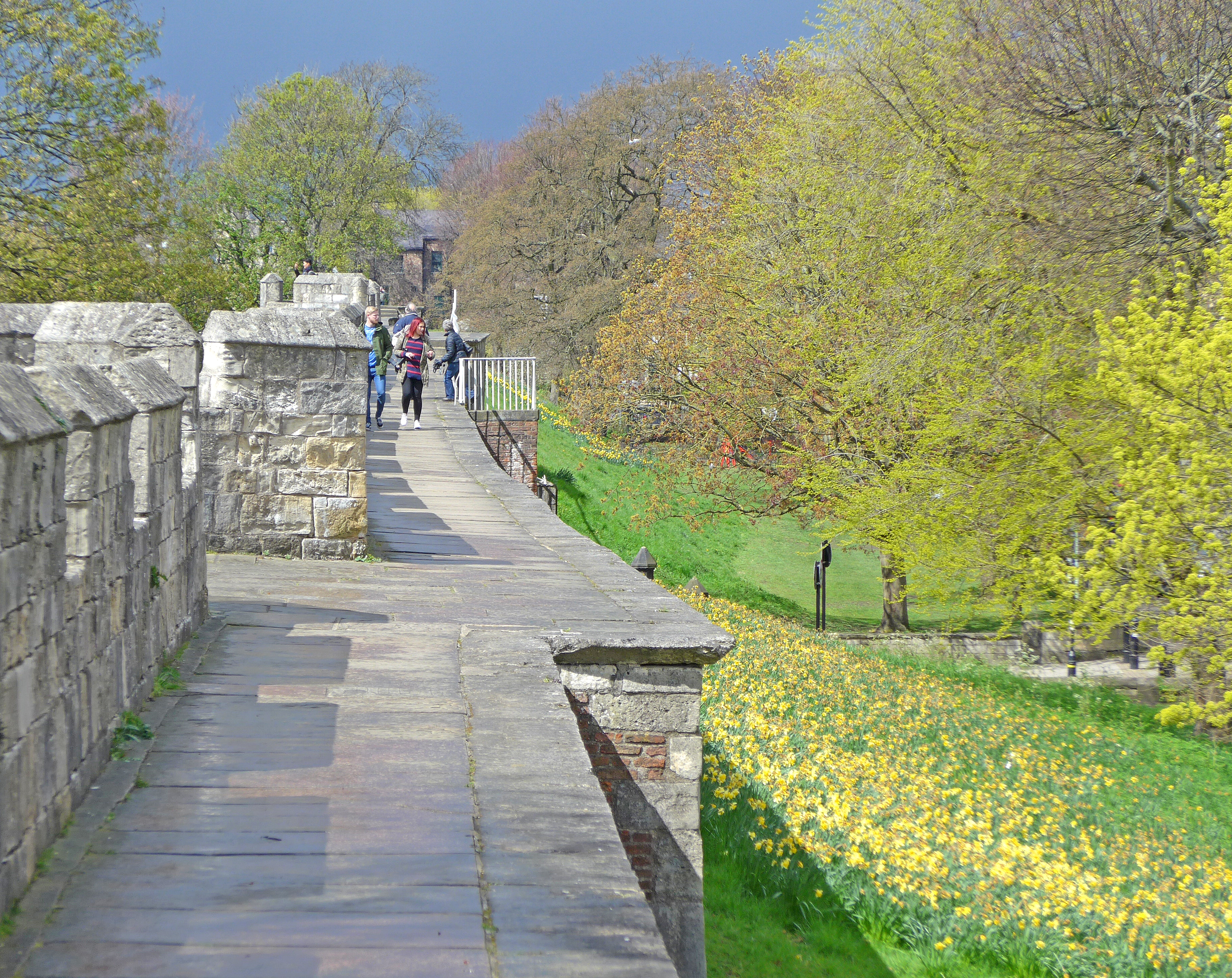
Yorkstone is used for the footpaths of York city walls

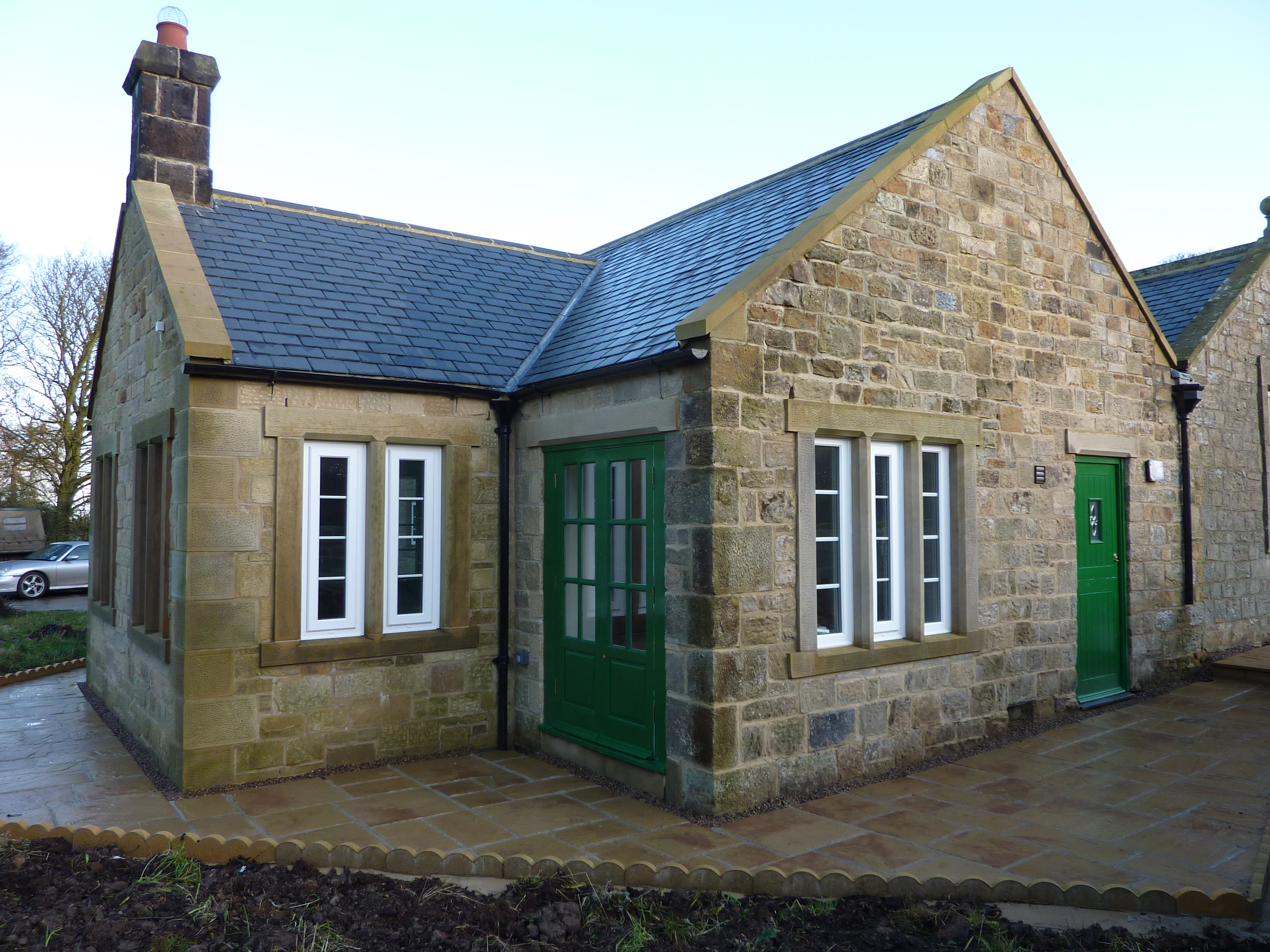
Yorkstone used to build a house and pave its yard.

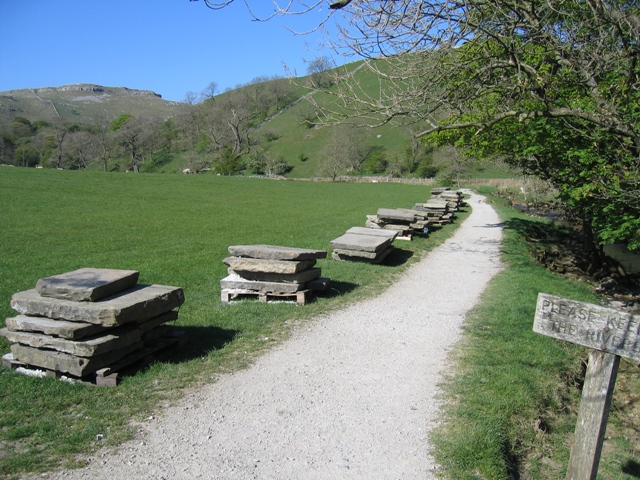
Yorkstone slabs

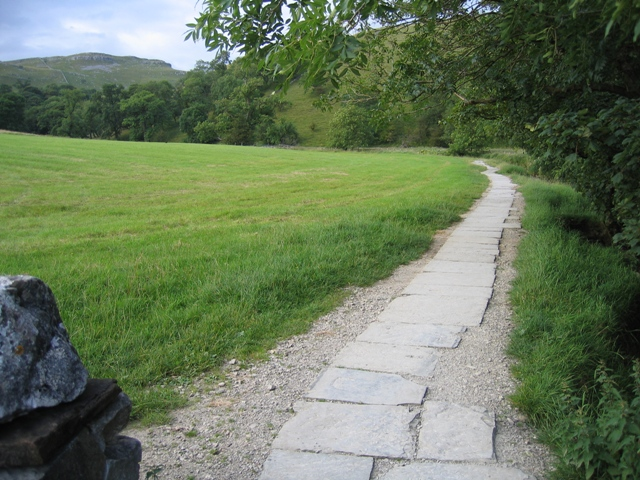
Newly-laid

Yorkstone or York stone is a variety of sandstone, specifically from quarries in Yorkshire that have been worked since the middle ages. Yorkstone is a tight grained, Carboniferous sedimentary rock. The stone consists of quartz, mica, feldspar, clay and iron oxides.

The ratio of quartz to mica varies considerably. The stone can be split along mica-rich layers: it has a slaty cleavage and may therefore be called sandstone slate. Formerly riven (split with a chisel along the bedding planes between the sedimentary layers), it is now also often sawn. It is used for flagstones and for building walls.

Known for its hard-wearing and durable qualities, Yorkstone has been used in a wide array of building, construction and landscaping applications around the world for many years. In Yorkshire, split stones called thackstone (Scots thack, English thatch) were employed as roofing. The traditional London paving stone has been cut and pressed from quarries in Holmfirth, West Yorkshire. Yorkshire Stone is most commonly used for paving and garden walls, but it is also a popular choice for new builds as well as home extensions and conversions due to its durability under harsh weather conditions.

The colour of Yorkstone depends on the minerals within its makeup and differs throughout the quarries from which it is mined. It also depends on the age of the stone and turns darker with weathering. Reused Yorkstone paving, salvaged from demolished sites, is valued for its naturally weathered surfaces. Reclaimed Yorkshire stone is popular for its colouring and for environmentally friendly builds.

Yorkstone often shows features such as laminations with cross bedding, and rusty Liesegang bands.

== See also ==
- Bargate stone
- Brownstone
- List of stone
- Old Red Sandstone
