= Sedimentary structures =

Geologic structures formed during sediment deposition

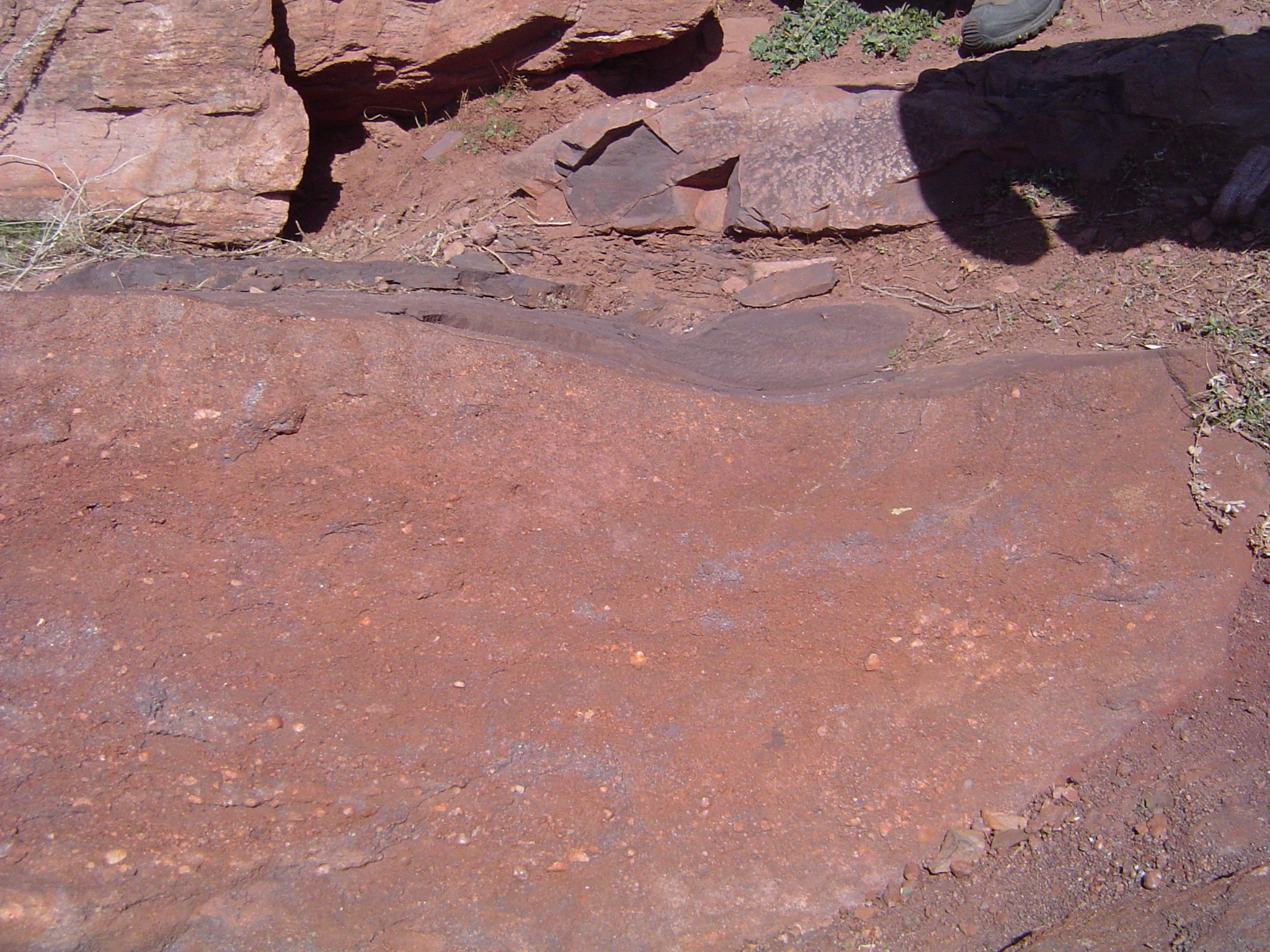
Megaripple/dune, formed in the upper flow regime, from Utah

Sedimentary structures include all kinds of features in sediments and sedimentary rocks, formed at the time of deposition.

Sediments and sedimentary rocks are characterized by bedding, which occurs when layers of sediment, with different particle sizes are deposited on top of each other. These beds range from millimeters to centimeters thick and can even go to meters or multiple meters thick.

Sedimentary structures such as cross-bedding, graded bedding, and ripple marks are utilized in stratigraphic studies. They help indicate the original position of strata in geologically complex terrains. They also provide insight into the depositional environment of the sediment.

== Flow structures ==
There are two kinds of flow structures: bidirectional (multiple directions, back-and-forth) and unidirectional. Flow regimes in single-direction (typically fluvial) flow, which at varying speeds and velocities produce different structures, are called bedforms. In the lower flow regime, the natural progression is from a flat bed, to some sediment movement (saltation etc.), to ripples, to slightly larger dunes. Dunes have a vortex in the lee side of the dune. As the upper flow regime forms, the dunes become flattened out, and then produce antidunes. At higher still velocity, the antidunes are flattened and most sedimentation stops, as erosion takes over as the dominant process.

== Bedforms vs. flow ==
Typical unidirectional bedforms represent a specific flow velocity, assuming typical sediments (sands and silts) and water depths, and a chart such as below can be used for interpreting depositional environments, with increasing water velocity going down the chart.

Flow regime	Bedform	Preservation potential	Identification tips
Lower
Lower	Lower plane bed	High	Flat laminae, almost lack of current
Lower	Ripple marks	Relatively Low	Small, cm-scale undulations
Lower	Sand waves	Medium to low	Rare, longer wavelength than ripples
Lower	Dunes/Megaripples	Low	Large, meter-scale ripples
Upper
Upper	Upper plane bed	High	Flat laminae, ± aligned grains (parting lineations)
Upper	Antidunes	Low	Water in phase with bedform, low angle, subtle laminae
Upper	Pool and chute	Very low	Mostly erosional features

== Ripple marks ==
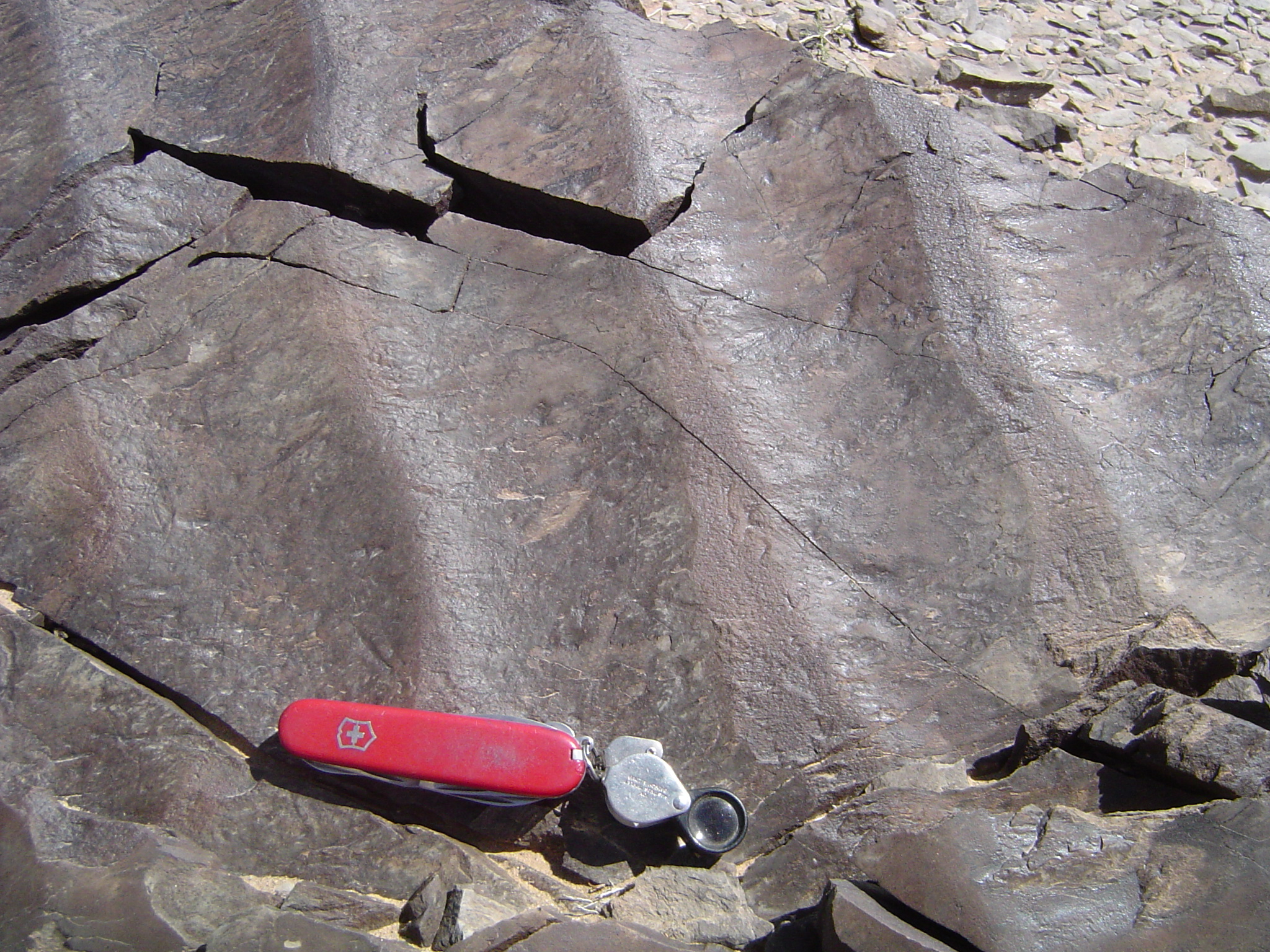
Wave ripple or symmetric ripple, from Permian rocks in Nomgon, Mongolia with "decapitation" of ripple crests due to change in current

Ripple marks usually form in conditions with flowing water, in the lower part of the Lower Flow Regime. There are two types of ripple marks:

Symmetrical ripple marks
Often found on beaches, they are created by a two way current, for example the waves on a beach (swash and backwash). This creates ripple marks with pointed crests and rounded troughs, which aren't inclined more to a certain direction. Three common sedimentary structures that are created by these processes are herringbone cross-stratification, flaser bedding, and interference ripples.
Asymmetrical ripple marks
These are created by a one way current, for example in a river, or the wind in a desert. This creates ripple marks with still pointed crests and rounded troughs, but which are inclined more strongly in the direction of the current. For this reason, they can be used as palaeocurrent indicators.

== Antidunes ==
Antidunes are the sediment bedforms created by fast, shallow flows of water with a Froude number greater than 1. Antidunes form beneath standing waves of water that periodically steepen, migrate, and then break upstream. The antidune bedform is characterized by shallow foresets, which dip upstream at an angle of about ten degrees that can be up to five meters in length. They can be identified by their low angle foresets. For the most part, antidunes bedforms are destroyed during decreased flow, and therefore cross bedding formed by antidunes will not be preserved.

== Biological structures ==
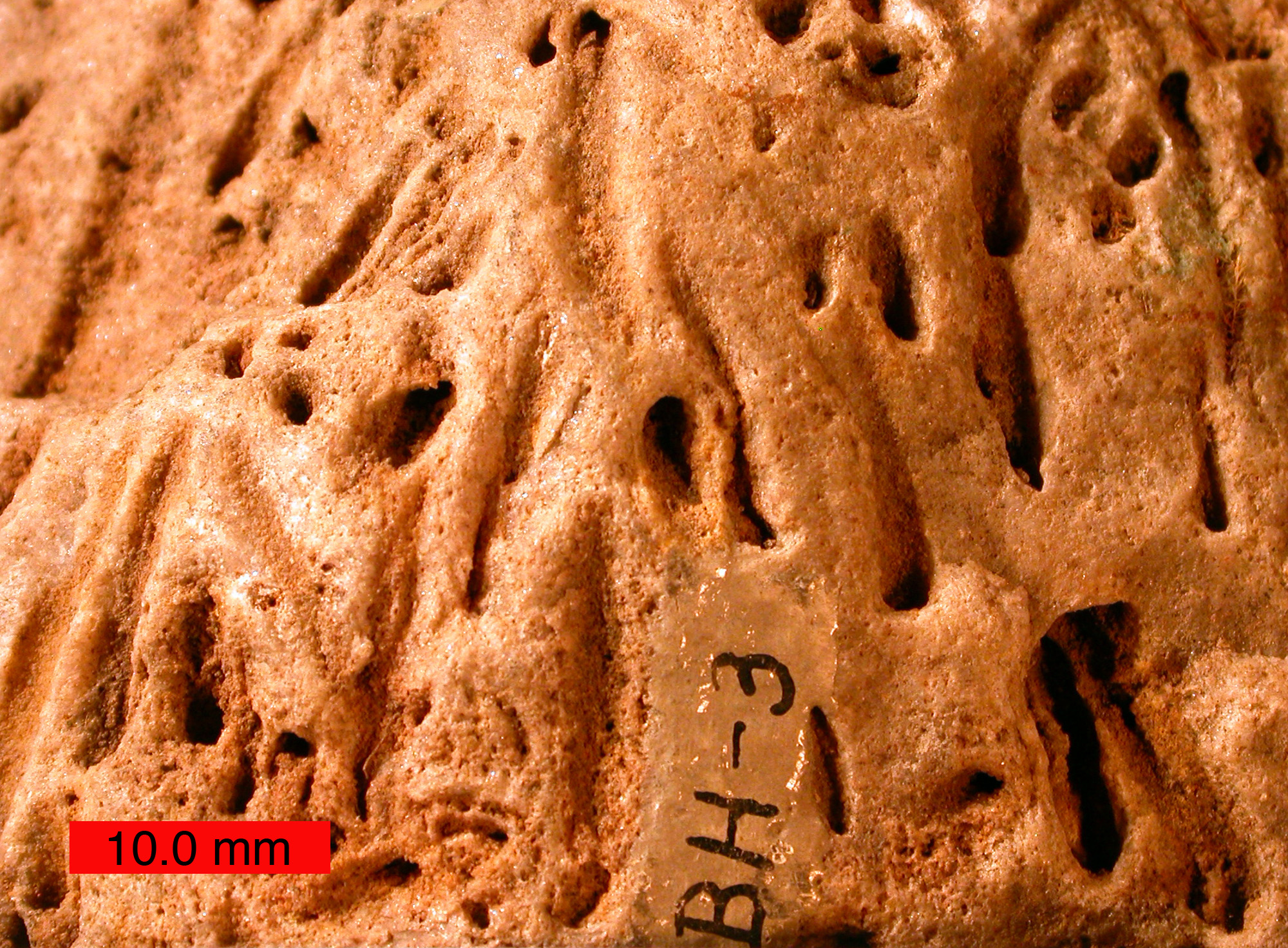
Skolithos trace fossil (scale bar is 10 mm)

A number of biologically-created sedimentary structures exist, called trace fossils. Examples include burrows and various expressions of bioturbation. Ichnofacies are groups of trace fossils that together help give information on the depositional environment. In general, as deeper (into the sediment) burrows become more common, the shallower the water. As (intricate) surface traces become more common, the water becomes deeper.

Microbes may also interact with sediment to form microbially induced sedimentary structures.

== Soft sediment deformation structures ==
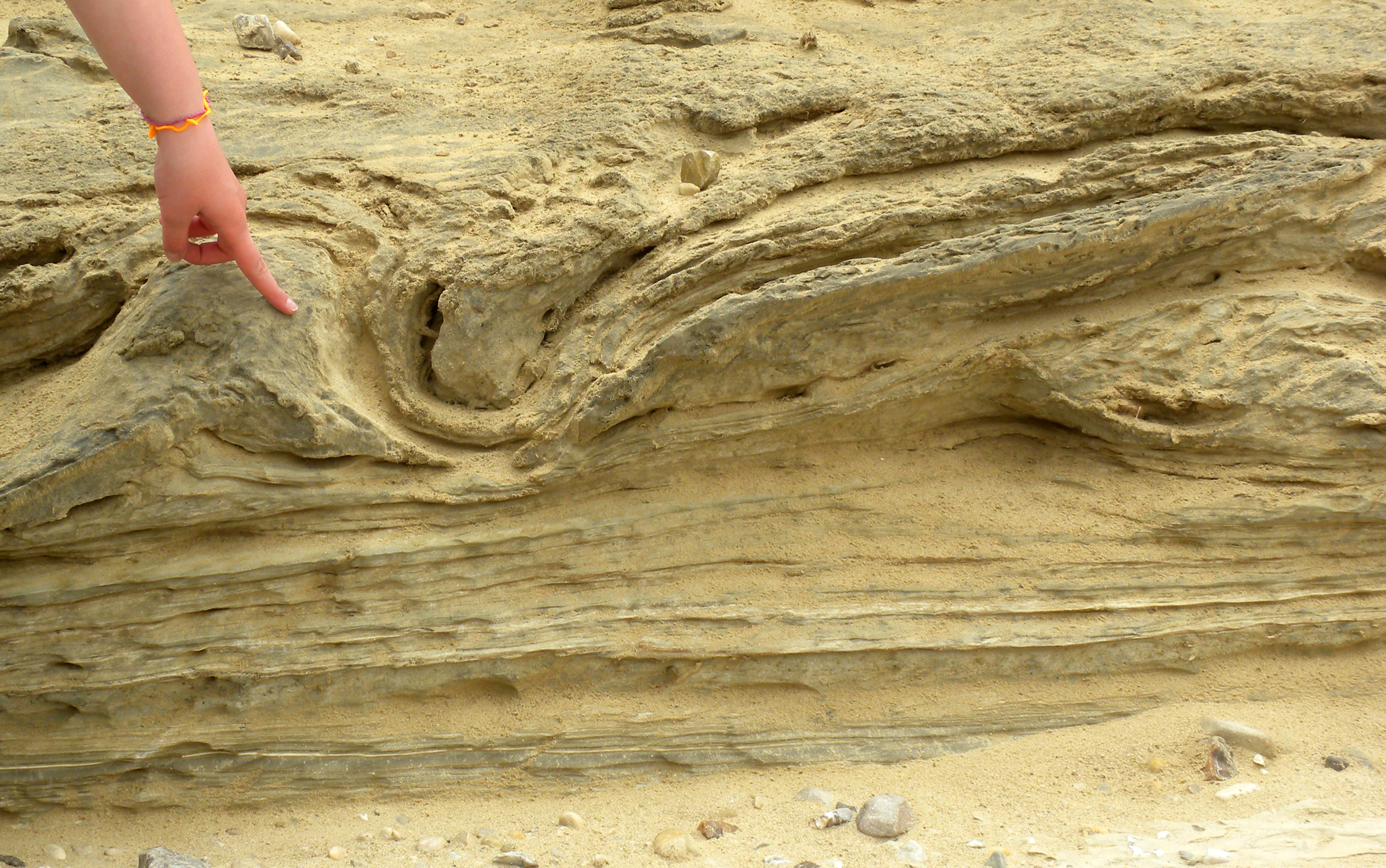
Soft sediment deformation (possibly a seismite) in Dead Sea sediments, Israel

Soft-sediment deformation structures or SSD, is a consequence of the loading of wet sediment as burial continues after deposition. The heavier sediment "squeezes" the water out of the underlying sediment due to its own weight. There are three common variants of SSD:

- load structures or load casts (also a type of sole marking) are blobs that form when a denser, wet sediment slumps down on and into a less dense sediment below.
- pseudonodules or ball-and-pillow structures, are pinched-off load structures; these may also be formed by earthquake energy and referred to as seismites.
- flame structures, "fingers" of mud that protrude into overlying sediments.
- clastic dikes are seams of sedimentary material that cut across sedimentary strata.

== Bedding plane structures ==
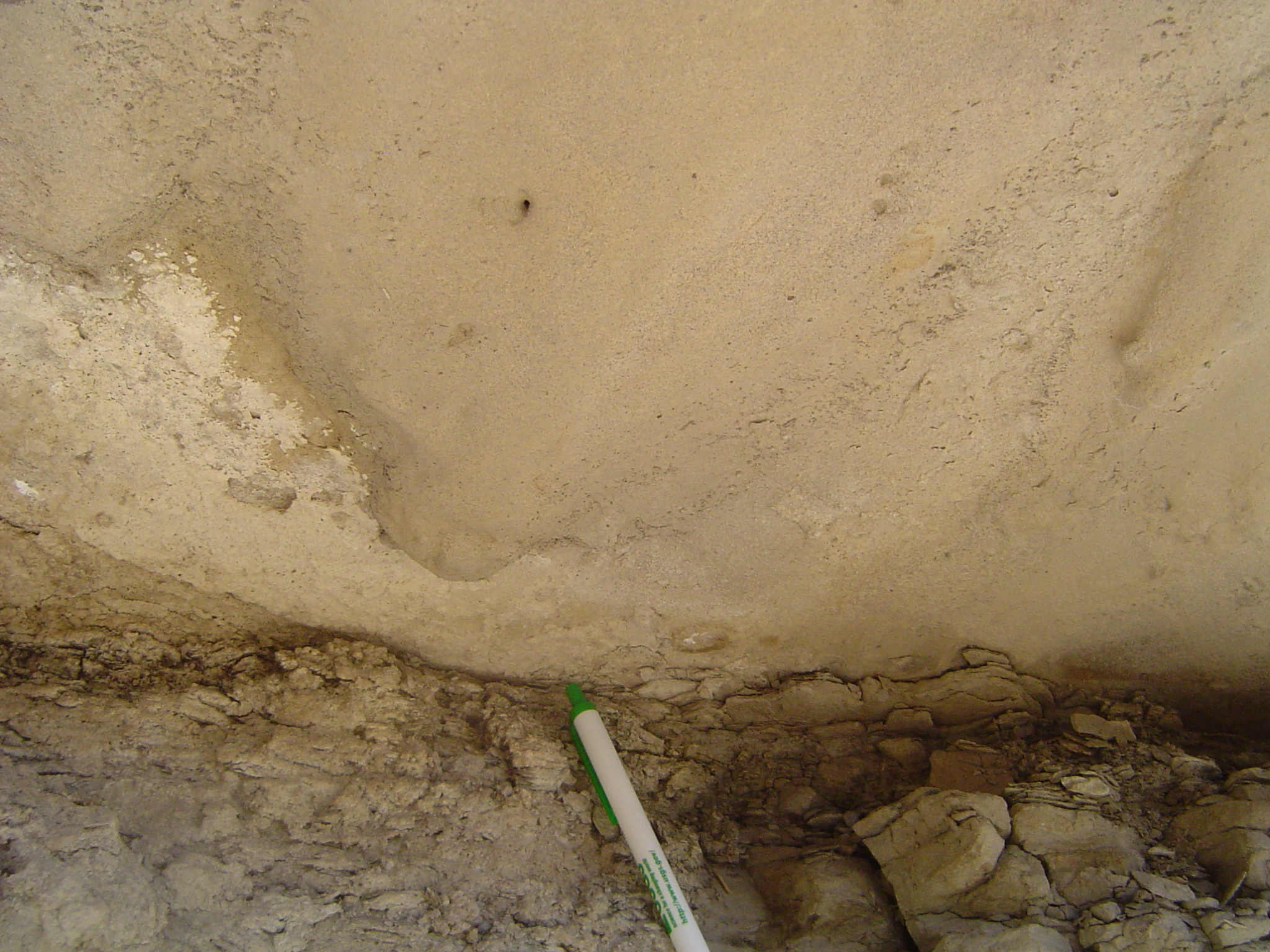
Flute cast from Book Cliffs area, Utah

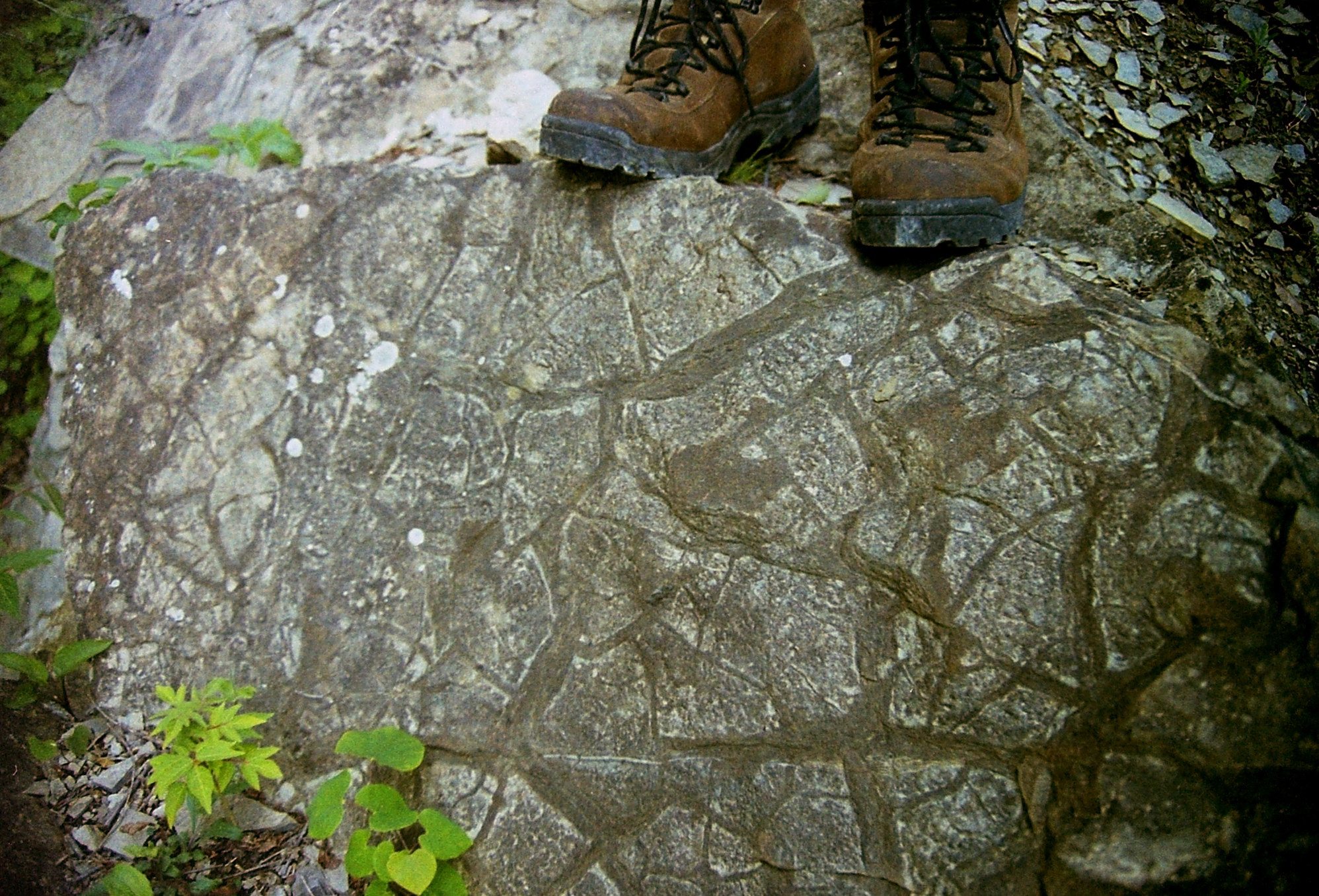
Mudcracks in rock at Roundtop Hill, Maryland

Bedding Plane Structures are commonly used as paleocurrent indicators. They are formed when sediment has been deposited and then reworked and reshaped. They include:

- Sole markings form when an object gouges the surface of a sedimentary layer; this groove is later preserved as a cast when filled in by the layer above. They include:
  - Flute casts are scours dug into soft, fine sediment which typically get filled by an overlying bed. Measuring the long axis of the flute cast gives the direction of flow, with the scoop-shaped end pointing in the upcurrent direction and the tapered end pointing downcurrent (paleoflow direction). The convexity of the flute cast also points stratigraphically down.
  - Tool marks are a type of sole marking formed by grooves left in a bed by objects dragged along by a current. The average direction of these can be assumed to be the axis of flow direction.
- Mudcracks form when mud is dewatered, shrinks, and leaves a crack. This tells you that the mud was saturated with water and then exposed to air. Mudcracks curl upwards, so they can be used as geopetal structures. Syneresis cracks form in a similar way, with the exception that they are never exposed to air, instead being caused by changes in the salinity of the surrounding water.
- Raindrop impressions form on exposed sediment by raindrop impacts.
- Parting lineations are subtly aligned minerals that form in the lower part of the Upper Flow Regime within plane beds.

- Bomb sag or bedding-plane sag is downwards deformation of tuff beds or other deposits where a volcanic bomb or volcanic block has fallen.

== Within bedding structures ==
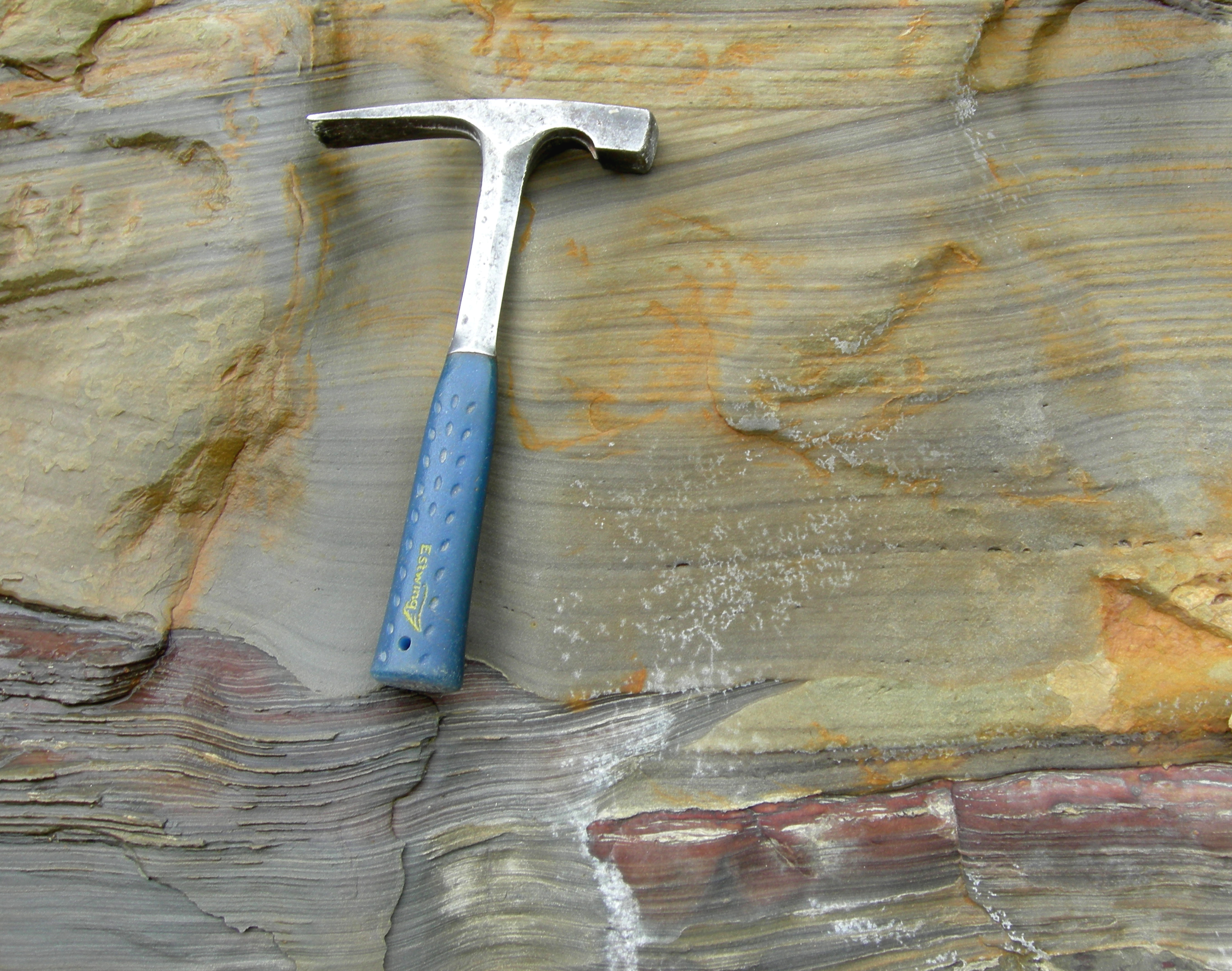
Cross-bedding and scour in a fine sandstone (Logan Formation, Mississippian, Jackson County, Ohio)

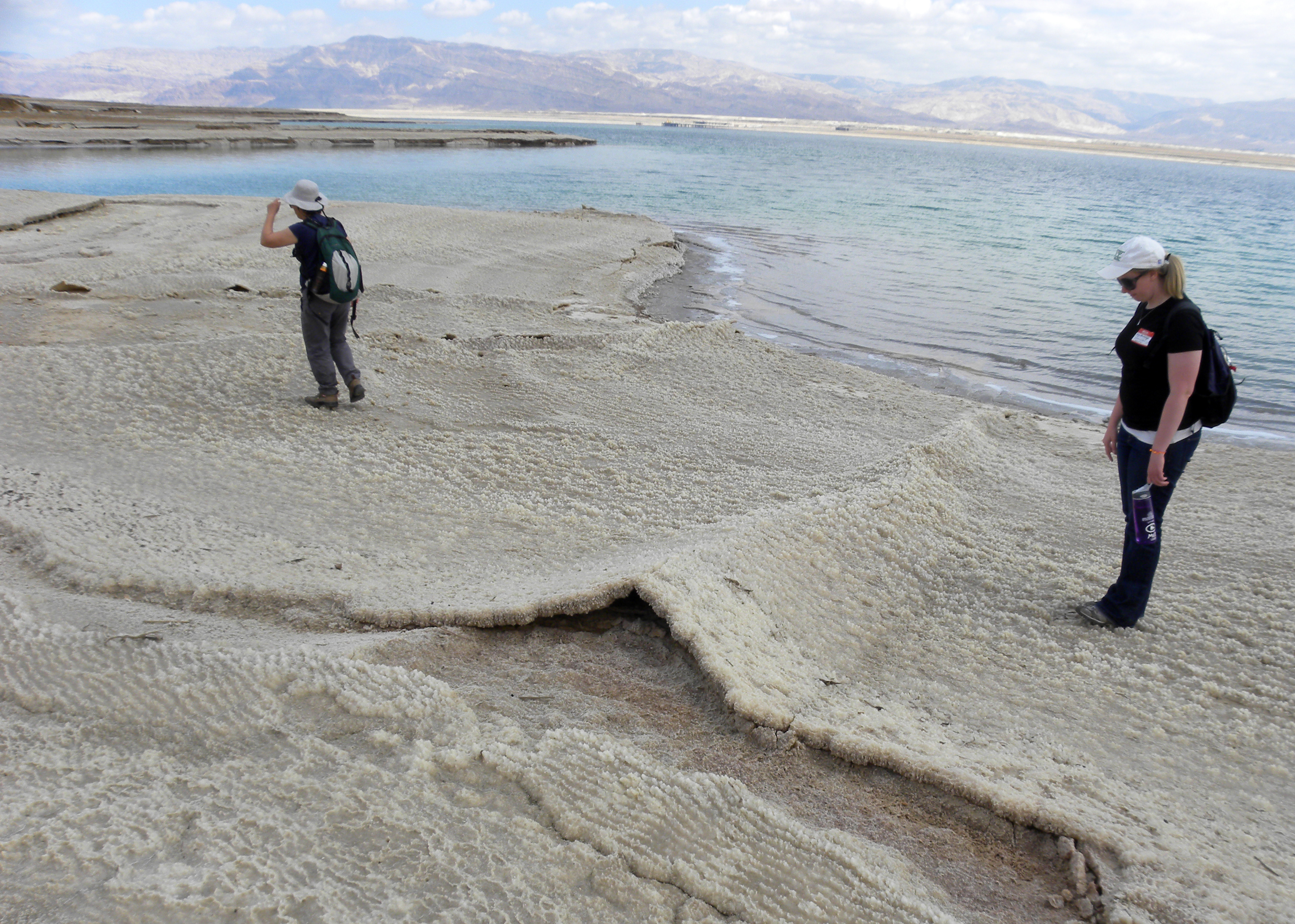
A teepee structure in modern halite deposits along the western shore of the Dead Sea, Israel

These structures are within sedimentary bedding and can help with the interpretation of depositional environment and paleocurrent directions. They are formed when the sediment is deposited.

Cross-bedding
Cross-bedding is the layering of beds deposited by wind or water inclined at an angle as much as 35° from the horizontal. Cross-beds form when sediment particles are deposited on steeper slopes of sand dunes on land or of sandbars in rivers and on the seafloor. Cross-bedding in wind-deposited dunes can be complex as a result of fast changing wind directions.
Hummocky cross-stratification
This stratification is made up of undulating sets of cross-laminae that are concave-up (swales) and convex-up (hummocks). These cross-beds gently cut into each other with curved erosional surfaces. They form in shallow-water, storm-dominated environments. Strong storm-wave action erodes the seabed into low hummocks and swales that lack a specific orientation.
Imbrication
This structure is formed by the stacking of larger clasts in the direction of flow.
Normal graded bedding
This structure occurs when current velocity changes and grains are progressively dropped out of the current. The most common place to find this is in a turbidite deposit. This can also be inverted, called reversed graded bedding, and is common in debris flows.
Bioturbation
In many sedimentary rocks, the bedding is broken by cylindrical tubes a few centimeters in diameter that extend vertically through multiple beds. These sedimentary structures are remnants of burrows and tunnels excavated by marine organisms that live on the ocean floor. These organisms churn and burrow through mud and sand a process called bioturbation. They ingest the sediment, digest the organic matter, and leave behind the remnants which fills the burrow.
Tidal bundle
Variation in bedding thickness in a tidal environment caused by alternation of spring and neap tides.

== Secondary sedimentary structures ==
Secondary sedimentary structures form after primary deposition occurs or, in some cases, during the diagenesis of a sedimentary rock. Common secondary structures include any form of bioturbation, soft-sediment deformation, teepee structures, root-traces, and soil mottling. Liesegang rings, cone-in-cone structures, raindrop impressions, and vegetation-induced sedimentary structures would also be considered secondary structures.

Secondary structures include fluid escape structures, formed when fluids escape from a sedimentary bed after deposition. Examples of fluid escape structures include dish structures, pillar structures, and vertical sheet structures.

== See also ==
- Reynolds number
