= Sand wave =

Sedimentary structure formed by water

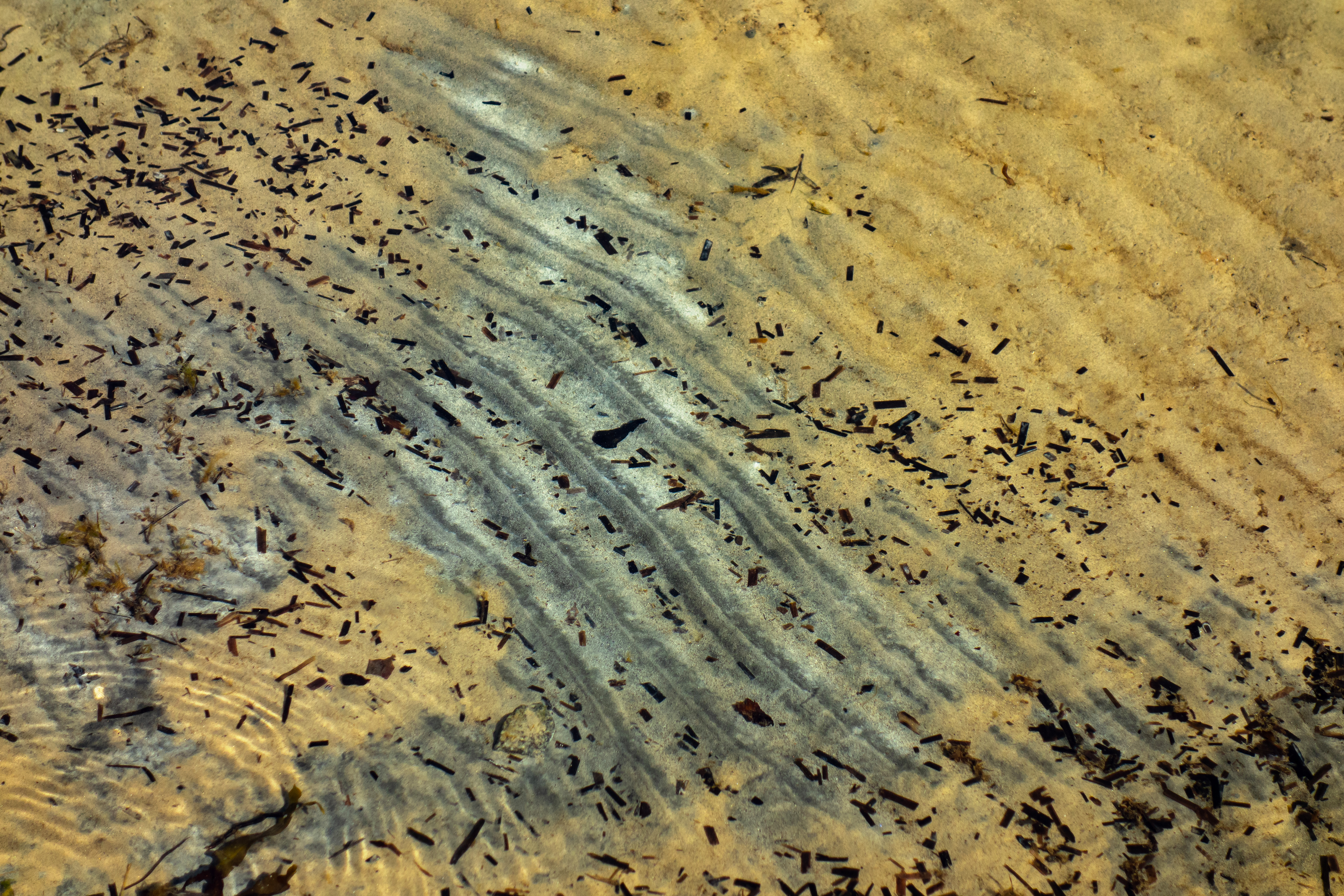
Sand waves under water in a shallow part of Gullmarn fjord

A sand wave is frequently defined as a type of usually a large, ridge-like bathymetric feature, called a bedform, that is created by the interaction between underwater unidirectional currents with noncohesive, granular sediment, e.g., silt, sand, and gravel and lies transverse to the flow of these currents. There exists a lack any universally accepted classification scheme among sedimentologists, geologists, and other Earth scientists that precisely defines the difference between sand waves and similar bedforms, such as ripples, megaripples, subaqueous dunes, and sediment waves. In some classification systems, antidunes are known as regressive sand waves and sand waves are classified as a type of dune. Sand waves are typically customary defined and thought of as part of a gradational continuum of bedforms that change with increasing current velocity and changes in the associated turbulence of the flowing water. According to some commonly used classification systems, this progression of bedforms, with increasing current velocity consists of current ripples, dunes (which includes sand waves), plane-beds, and antidunes. This progression is actually more complicated then this because the type of bedform associated with a particular current velocity is also determined by the size and mixture of either the silt, sand, or gravel being transported by the current.

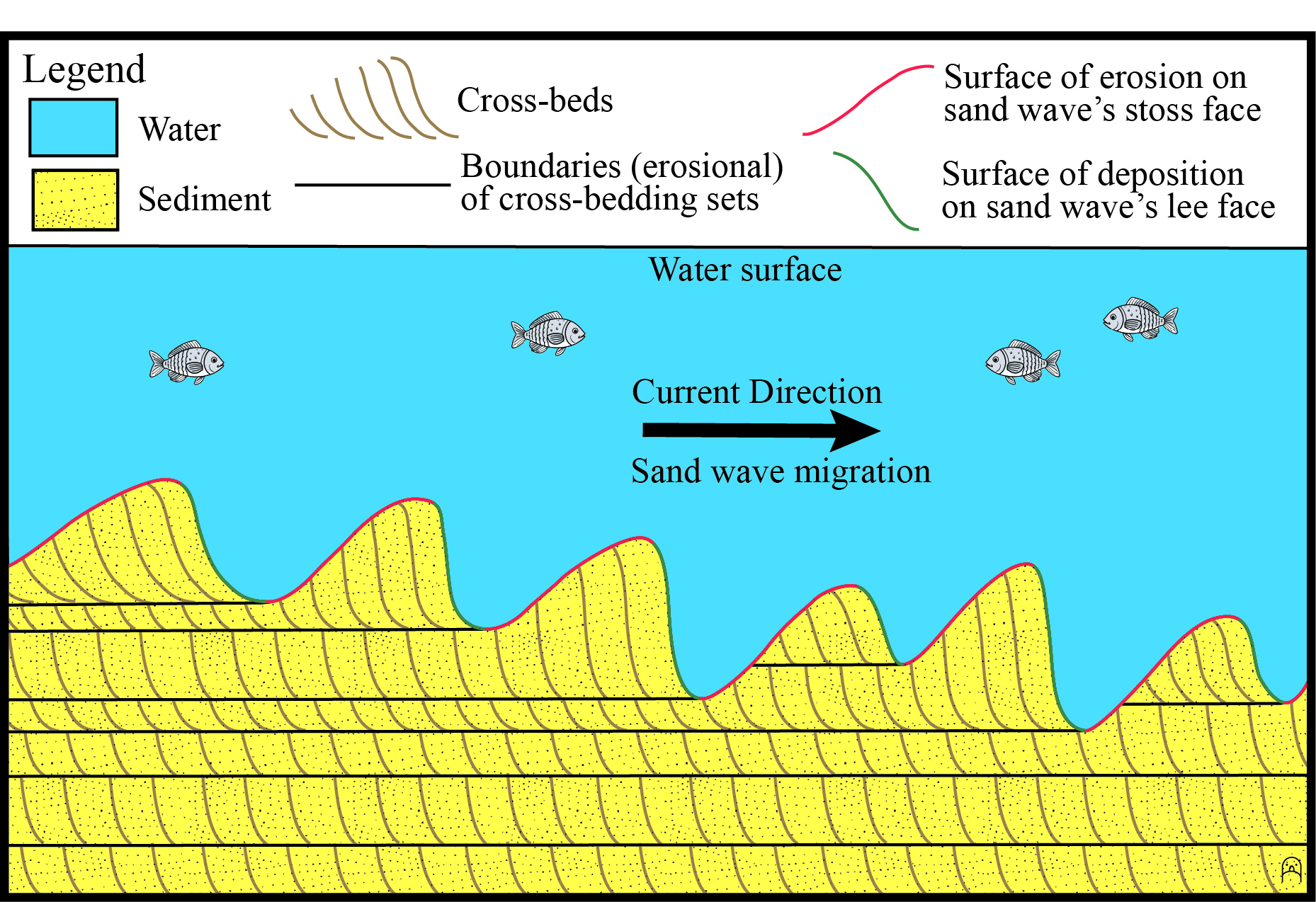
Idealized cross-section of sets of cross-bedding left behind by migrating sand waves in unidirectional current

When bedforms such as such as ripples, dunes, or nontidal sand waves migrate downcurrent under the influence of a unidirectional current, they often deposit a stratum, known as a set, of cross-bedded coarse grained, typically sandy, sediment. As one of these bedforms migrates downstream, fluid flow causes sand grains to saltate up the stoss (upcurrent) side of the bedform. At the peak of the bedform, the sand grains collect as unstable mass until it collapses under its own weight and this granular mass of sand avalanches down the lee (downcurrent) side of the bedform depositing a laminae of sand on its lee side. As a result, the repeated avalanches of sand grains build the lee side downcurrent. With the contemporaneous erosion of the upcurrent stoss side, this process causes the bedform to migrate downcurrent. This process also creates the sedimentary structure known as cross-bedding, which consists of parallel laminae of sand dipping in the direction of the current. If the quantity of sediment being transported by the current, is less than or equally to its capacity to transport it, deposition will not occur as the sediment will move downcurrent as the erosion of a bedform's stoss side completely erodes sediment previously deposited on its lee side and redeposits it on the bedform's accreting and migrating lee side.

== Tidal sand wave ==
In case of a tidal sand wave, also named tidal dune, it is a large, ridge-like bathymetric feature (bedform) that is created by the interaction of oscillatory tidal currents with noncohesive, granular sediment, e.g., silt, sand, and gravel. They can be as much as 1–25 m (3.3–82.0 ft) high and have wavelengths of 25–1,000 m (82–3,281 ft). Tidal sand waves occur as sets of long-crested parallel ridges typified by low to mild slopes that are between one and ten degrees. They also typically have smaller ridge-like bedforms, either dunes or megaripples, resting upon and actively migrating across it slopes. The imbalance in the flow of opposing tidal currents is reflected in the degree of asymmetry of the sand wave. When the opposing tidal currents are balanced, a tidal sand wave will be symmetrical and very slowly, if at all, migrate across the bottom. With increasing imbalance of the opposing tidal currents, a tidal sand wave will migrate at increasing rates across the bottom and exhibit increasing asymmetry in form. In addition, its migration rate will change with spring/neap tidal cycles.

This type of sand waves are restricted in occurrence to tidal environments. Such tidally influence environments are found associated with estuarine and shoal areas typified by complexes of banks and channels; restricted shelf seas; shallow-marine platforms; and, rarely, open continental shelves. Some of the sand waves reported from open oceanic shelves either might have been constructed by other, nontidal currents or are relict, inactive landforms due to cessation of tidal processes after their formation. They occur in shallow seas more or less restricted by land masses, notably the North Sea and the Celtic Sea in northwest Europe. Other areas of restricted shelf with sand waves are the Inland Sea (near Japan), the White Sea (Russia), the Taiwan Strait and Strait of Malacca, the San Matías Gulf (in the South Atlantic), Long Island Sound, the Cape Cod area, and the Gulf of St. Lawrence.

Allen developed the most widely accepted models for the internal structure of tidal sand waves. Berné(2000) This model proposes that the internal structure and degree of morphologic symmetry-asymmetry is function of increasing tidal time and velocity asymmetry between the flood and ebb phases of the tidal cycle. In this model, the surface morphology of sand waves grade from symmetrical sand waves formed by flood and ebb phase of equal duration and strength to asymmetrical sand waves form by flood and ebb phases of greatly unequal duration and strength. The symmetrical sand waves consist of internally medium-scale cross-beds with opposite directions of dip known as herringbone cross-stratification. The opposing direction of cross-bedding represent periodic reversals in the current direction during a series of tidal cycles. The asymmetrical sand waves, which are formed when either the flood phase is of greater duration and strength than the ebb phase or the ebb phase is of greater duration and strength than the flood phase, consist internally of large scale-unidirectional cross-beds. The large scale-unidirectional cross-beds of asymmetrical sand waves contain truncation surfaces, called reactivation surfaces. They represent the reworking of the lee slope during periods of slack water that occur within a tidal cycle. These large scale-unidirectional cross-beds also exhibit long term, lateral, cyclic changes in the thickness and grain size of the cross-laminae within a single cross-bed known as a tidal bundle. They are associated with neap–spring tidal cycles.

== See also ==
- Sand dune
- Ripple marks
