= Tidal bundle =

A tidal bundle is a sedimentary structure that forms in tidal areas as a result of spring and neap tides.

== Overview ==
A tidal bundle sequence can be seen as a variation in bed thickness with a periodicity of 14 days (diurnal) or 28 days (semidiurnal). During the neap tide, when the tidal current strength is weakest, smaller quantities of finer grains are deposited. As the tidal variation grows larger, towards the spring tide, larger quantities of coarser material will be deposited which results in an increasing bed thickness. Bed thickness will be greatest at the spring tide and then decreases as the tidal variation grows smaller, towards the neap tide again and the thinnest beds.

=== Significance ===
The presence of tidal bundles depends on the presence of spring and neap tides, which can only occur in three-body gravitational systems (the Earth, the Sun and the Moon). Therefore, the earliest time from which tidal bundles can be identified gives a conclusive lower bound on the age of the Moon.

== See also ==
- Herringbone cross-stratification
