= Wave-formed ripple =

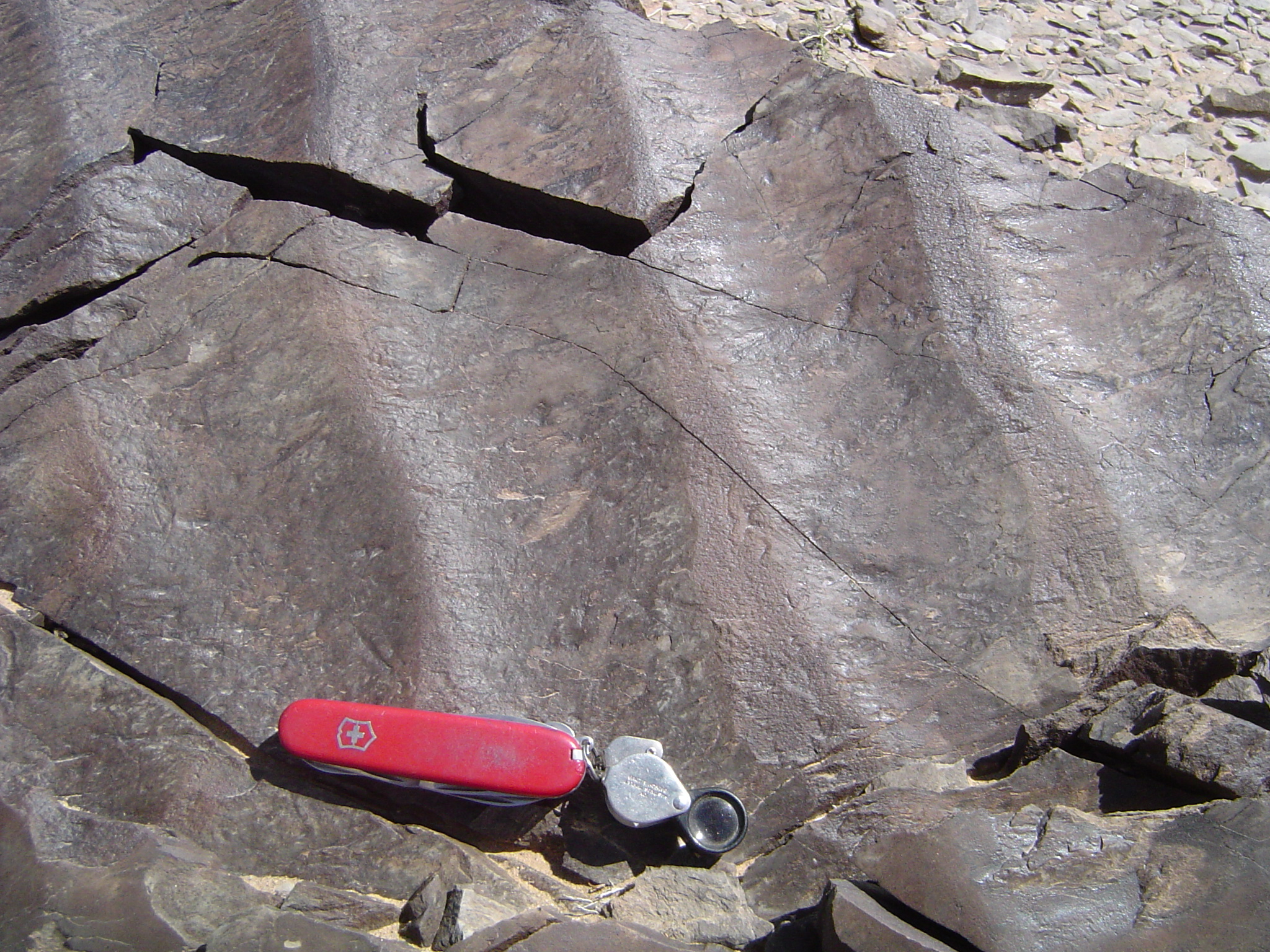
Wave ripple or symmetric ripple, from Permian rocks in Nomgon, Mongolia. Note "decapatation" of ripple crests due to change in current.

In sedimentology, wave-formed ripples or wave-formed ripple marks are a feature of sediments (sandstones, limestones, siltstones) and dunes. These ripple marks are often characterised (and thus distinguished from current ripples) by symmetric cross sections and long relatively straight crests, which may commonly bifurcate. Commonly, these crests can be truncated by subsequent flows. Their wavelength (periodicity) depends on the sediment grain size, water depth and water-particle orbits in the waves. On tidal flats the pattern of wave-formed ripples may be complicated, as a product of changing depth and wind and tidal runoff directions. Symmetrical ripples are commonly found in shallow waters. Beaches are a good place to find these ripples.

While wave-formed ripples are traditionally described as symmetrical, asymmetric wave ripples are common in shallow waters along sandy shores. They are produced by bottom oscillations generated by passing breaker waves, which have unequal intensity in opposite directions.

Wave-formed ripples indicate an environment with weak currents where water motion is dominated by wave oscillations.

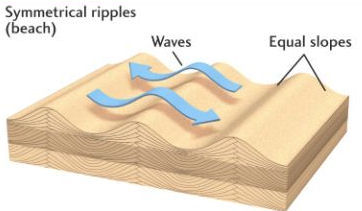
Symmetrical ripple

Although symmetrical ripples are also called bi-directional ripples there is a difference between them. Bi-directional ripples are rarely symmetrical due to the difference in force of the two directions, where as the wave formed or oscillation ripples form from the circular water movement pattern of water molecules. These ripples form parallel to the shore line. They usually display rounded troughs and rounded crests.

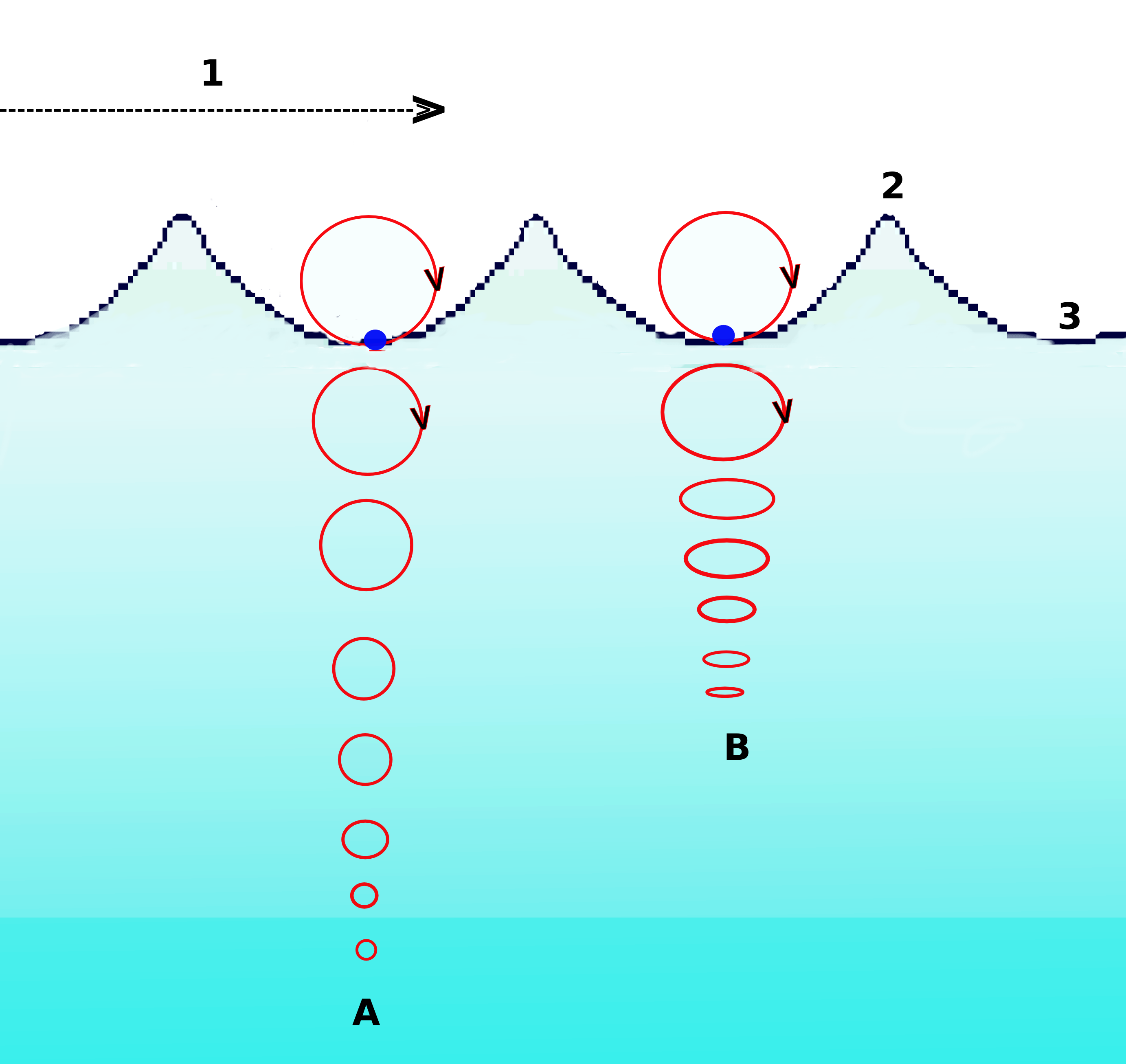
Wave motion-i18n A=Effect of oscillatory motion in deep water B=Effect of oscillatory motion in shallow water 1=Progression of wave 2=Wave crest 3=Wave trough

== Ripples ==
Ripples are relatively small, elongated ridges that form on bed surfaces perpendicular to current flow. With continuous current flow in one direction, asymmetrical ripples form. Asymmetrical ripples contain a steeper slope downstream. With an alternation in current flow from one direction to the opposite symmetrical ripples form. Symmetrical ripples tend to have the same slope on both sides of the crest.

== Formation ==
Symmetrical ripples form as water molecules oscillate in small circles. A particle of water within a wave does not move with the wave but rather it moves in a small circle between the wave crest and wave trough. This movement of water molecules is the same for all water molecules effected by the wave. The water molecules continue to do this to a depth equal to 1/2 the wavelength. The water molecule traveling in a circular pattern interacts with the sediment on the floor and moves the sediment into symmetrical ripples. These ripples can be either straight crested or sinuous crested ripples.

== See also ==
- Sedimentary structures
- Bedform
