= Raindrop impressions =

Geological feature

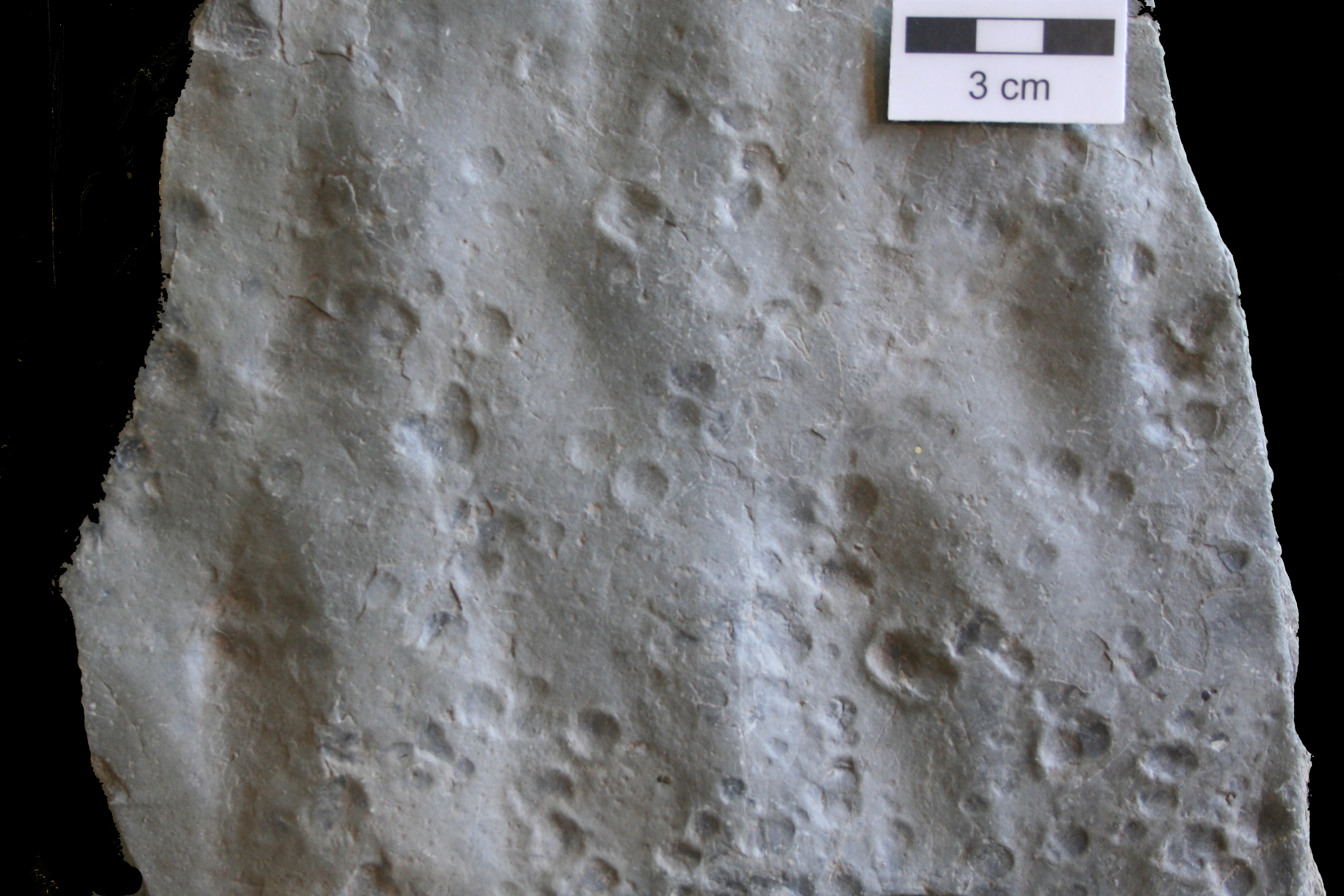
Fossil raindrop impressions on the top of a wave-rippled sandstone from the Horton Bluff Formation (Mississippian), near Avonport, Nova Scotia

Raindrop impressions are a geological feature characterized by small crater-like pits with slightly raised edges that are the result of the impact of raindrop impacts on soft sediment surfaces.

Sedimentary structures with similar appearance have been found. They can be considered a type of fossil, but their significance and authenticity has been questioned.

== Description ==
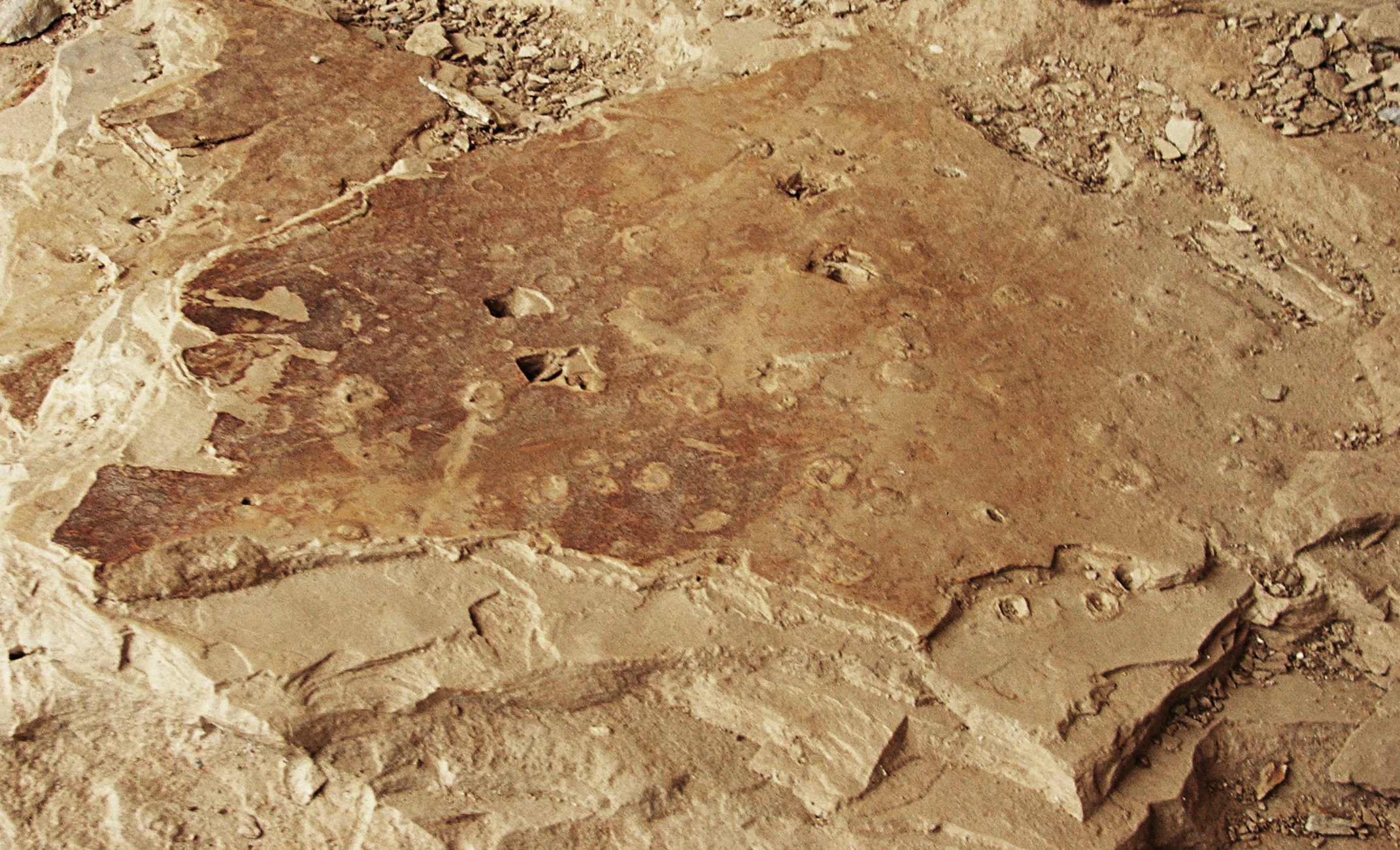
Fossil raindrops

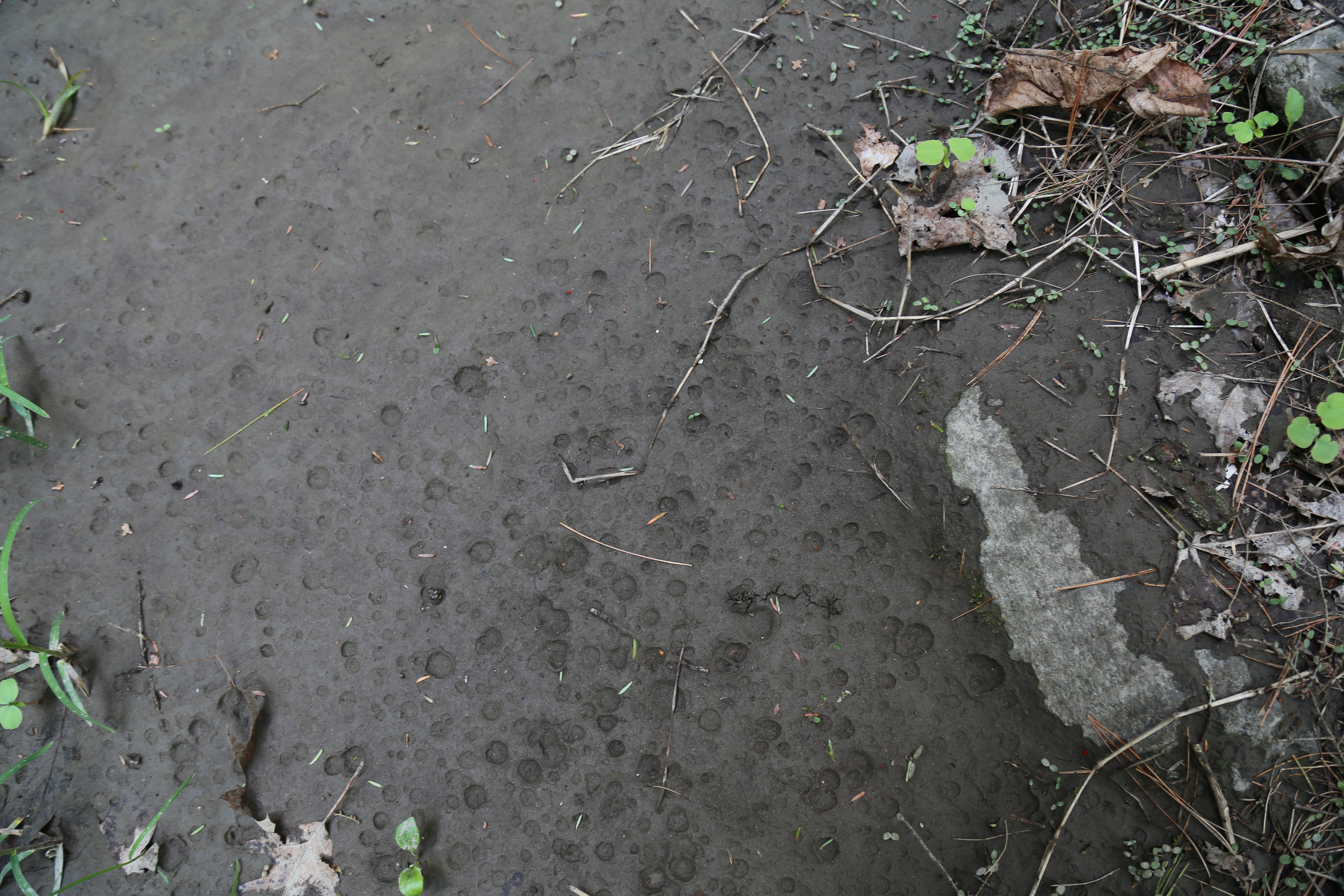
Modern raindrop impressions in stream sediments near Hanover, NH

Raindrop impressions are only a few millimeters thick and less than 1 centimeter in diameter. They can be preserved as widely scattered impressions or in close proximity to one another on the sediment surface.

Raindrop impressions can appear as small craters or as small raised bumps. If the sample has craters, the top of the sample is being viewed because the rain would have fallen onto it making indentations. If the sample has small raised bumps, the bottom of the sample is being viewed. In this case, the raindrop impressions were created in the sediment, which was then followed by more sediment which filled the impressions, creating, what appear to be, raised bumps on the bottom of the upper layer.

Fossilized raindrop impressions can help scientists determine historical atmospheric pressure.

== Other explanations for the features ==
Rainfall is not the only explanation for the geological feature, and not all "raindrop impressions" are considered to have formed due to the impact of raindrops. Arguments against a raindrop origin include:

- During shower activity raindrops cover the entire surface, whereas raindrop impressions are generally scattered and few in number.
- Because the rain is falling "everywhere," raindrop impressions should occur equally on sand-sized material as well as mud, yet in the geologic record these impressions are largely confined to fine-grained rock.
- Even when raindrop impressions form in mud during a shower, further rainfall eventually destroys them, leaving a surface which is not helpful to further preservation of impressions.
- Many examples cited as modern or fossil raindrop impressions can be explained by air bubbles rising through the mud.
- The characteristics of any impression depend on so many variables they can not be used convincingly to demonstrate those impressions formed specifically by raindrops.

In order for raindrop impressions to be preserved in the rock record, the impression would have to have occurred towards the end of a rain shower. The decreased number of impacts at this time accounts for the scattered patterns of the impressions, and the specific saturation of the sediment allows for preservation.

It is difficult to differentiate between actual impressions made by rain and other sources such as gas bubbles escaping, or dripping from another surface, because the structures that are preserved have the same characteristics.

== See also ==
- Petrology
