= Interference ripples =

Interference ripples are a type of sedimentary structure made up of two sets of ripples formed at right-angles to each other as a result of there being two dominant paleocurrents. These ripples may be formed in the beds of intermittent streams.
