= Teepee structure =

Sedimentary structures

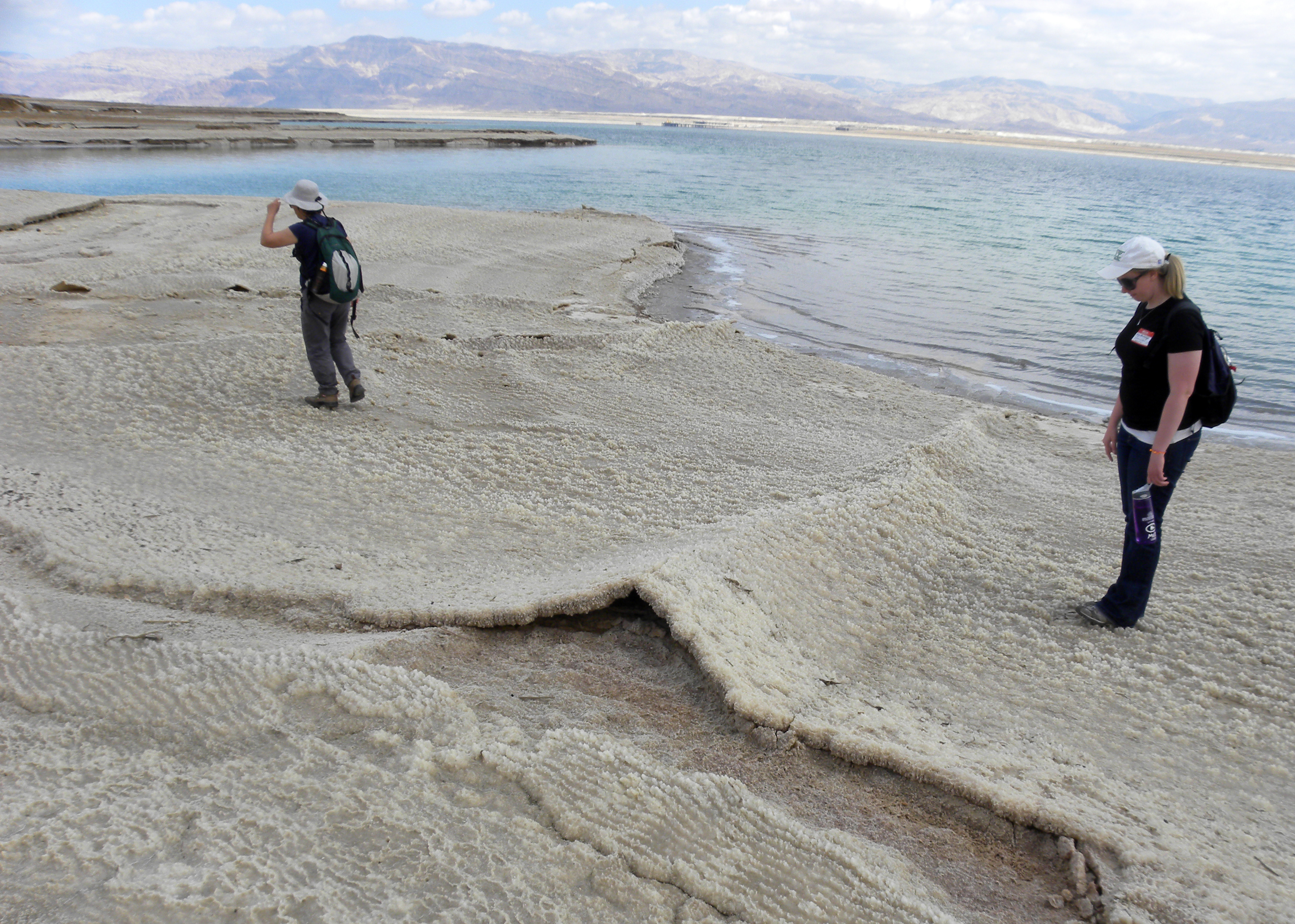
A modern teepee structure on the shore of the Dead Sea.

Teepee (also spelled tepee or tipi) structures are sedimentary structures interpreted to represent formation in peritidal environments. Teepees are largely the result of evaporation of water and subsequent precipitation of minerals within sediment, resulting in expansion and buckling to form a teepee-like shape. Their name originates from geologists working in the Guadalupe Mountains, who noted their appearance in cross-section resembles that of a Native American teepee.

Teepee structures have been observed in rocks more than 2.7 billion years old, and can be seen forming in modern environments on Earth, such as the Dead Sea.

== Formation ==
Several mechanisms are involved in the formation of teepee structures, with displacive forces resulting from mineral precipitation likely the most important.

=== Displacive force from mineral precipitation ===
The precipitation of minerals (e.g., calcite, gypsum, halite) within sediments results in expansive forces. If supersaturated pore waters are maintained during mineral precipitation, the forces can be sufficient to deform sedimentary beds. This conditions would be particularly prevalent in areas with low rates of precipitation and high rates of evaporation, such as sabkhas.

=== Hydration of salts ===
The hydration of some minerals is associated with a significant increase in volume. The hydration of anhydrite to form gypsum, for example, results in an increase of volume by 63%. In arid environments where anhydrite is widespread, a storm or spring tide could case rapid hydration and swelling, resulting in increased stresses and buckling within the sediment to form teepees.

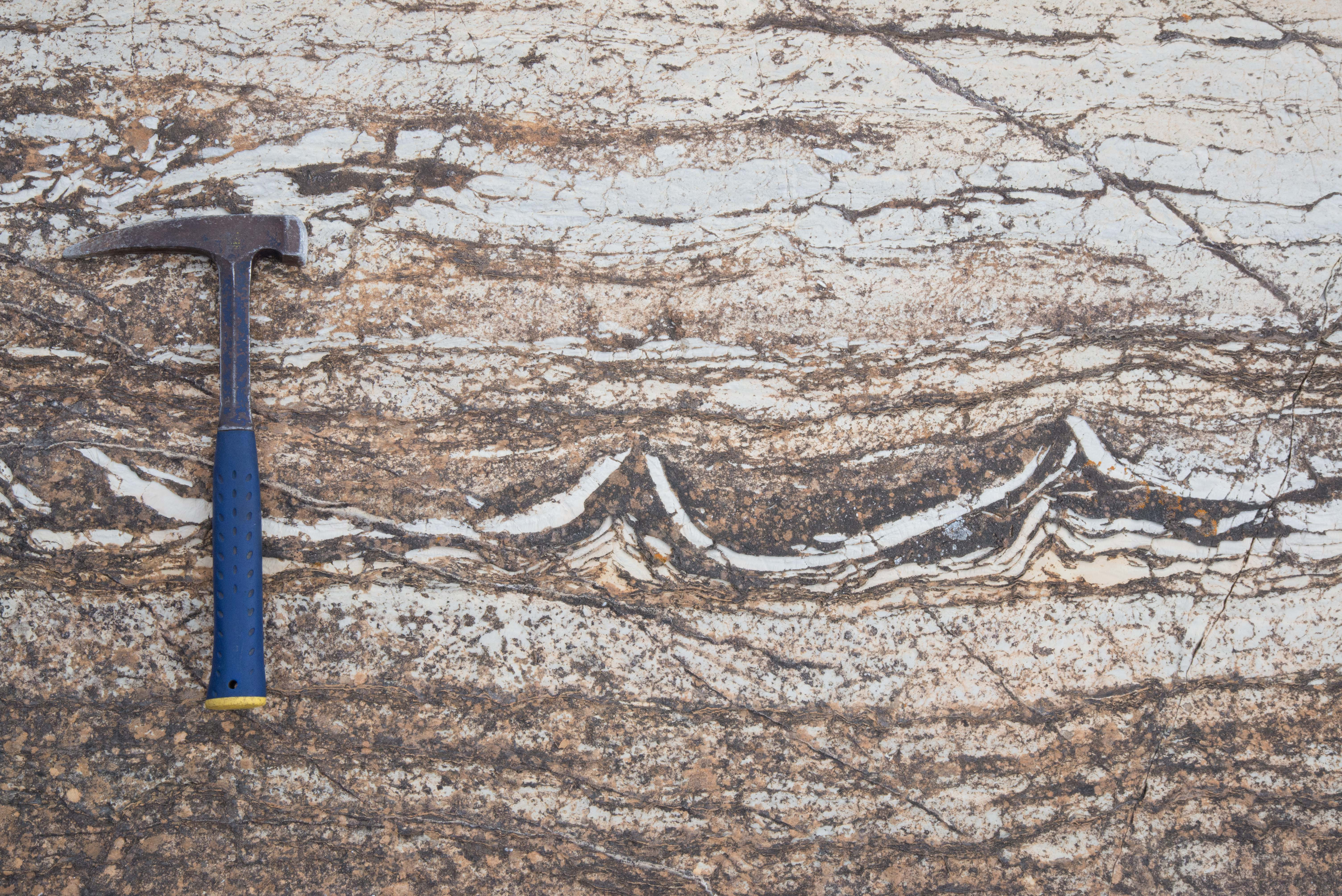
A cross-section view of an approximately 2 billion year old teepee structure in the Belcher Islands, Nunavut, Canada.

=== Thermal expansion ===
Different rocks expanded by different amounts when heated. A 10 m wide sheet of limestone will become approximately 4 mm wider when heated by 50°C, whereas a rock with significant amounts of sulphate or chloride minerals may expanded by 12 - 24 mm in width. While this is likely insufficient for the generation of teepees by itself, it may work in conjunction with the other mechanisms.

=== Earthquake ===
Some have suggested that teepee structures may be the result of seismic activity deforming sedimentary layers.
