= Cone-in-cone structures =

Vertical nested structure like tightly packed ice cream cones stacked inside one another

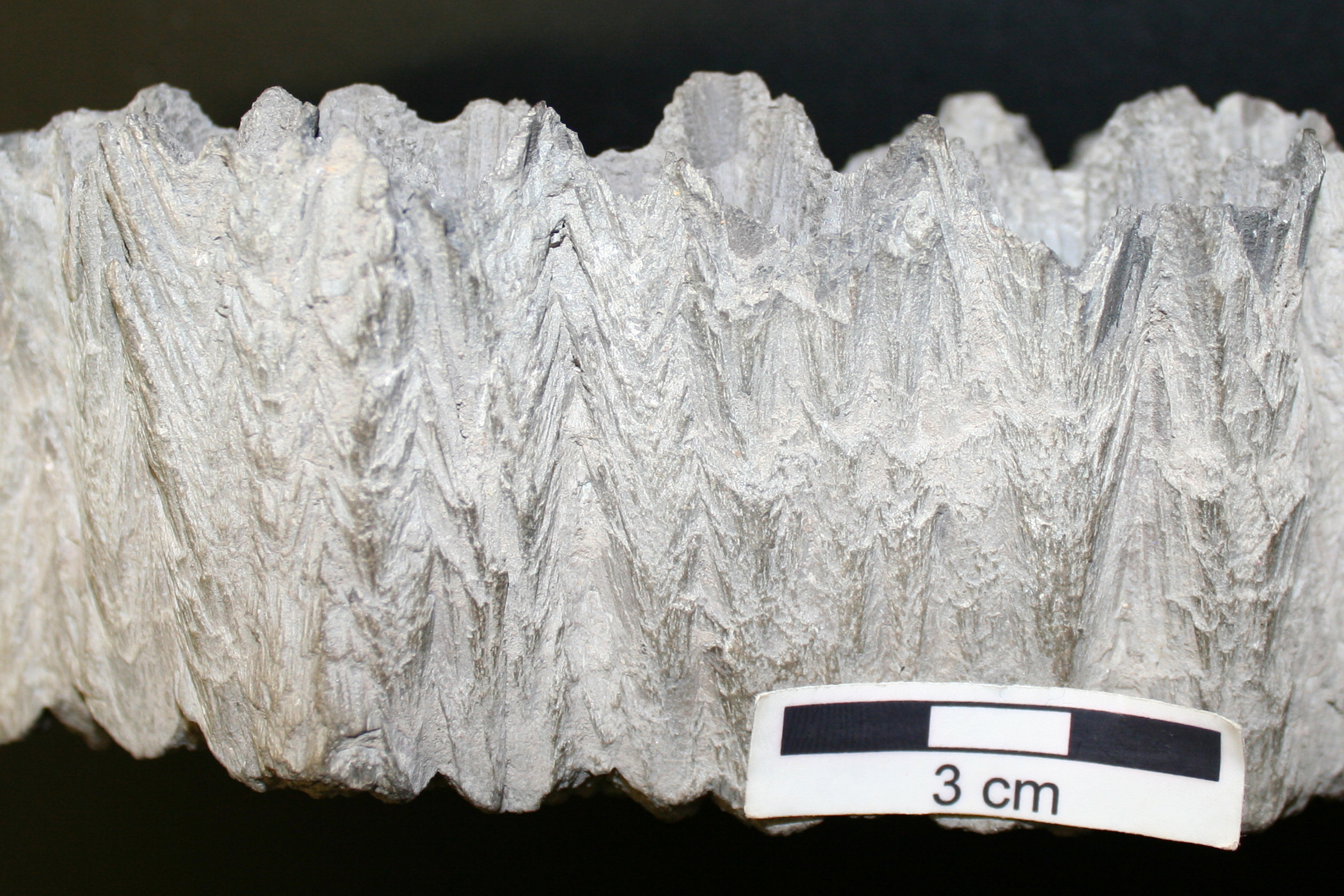
Cone-in-cone structures in limestone.

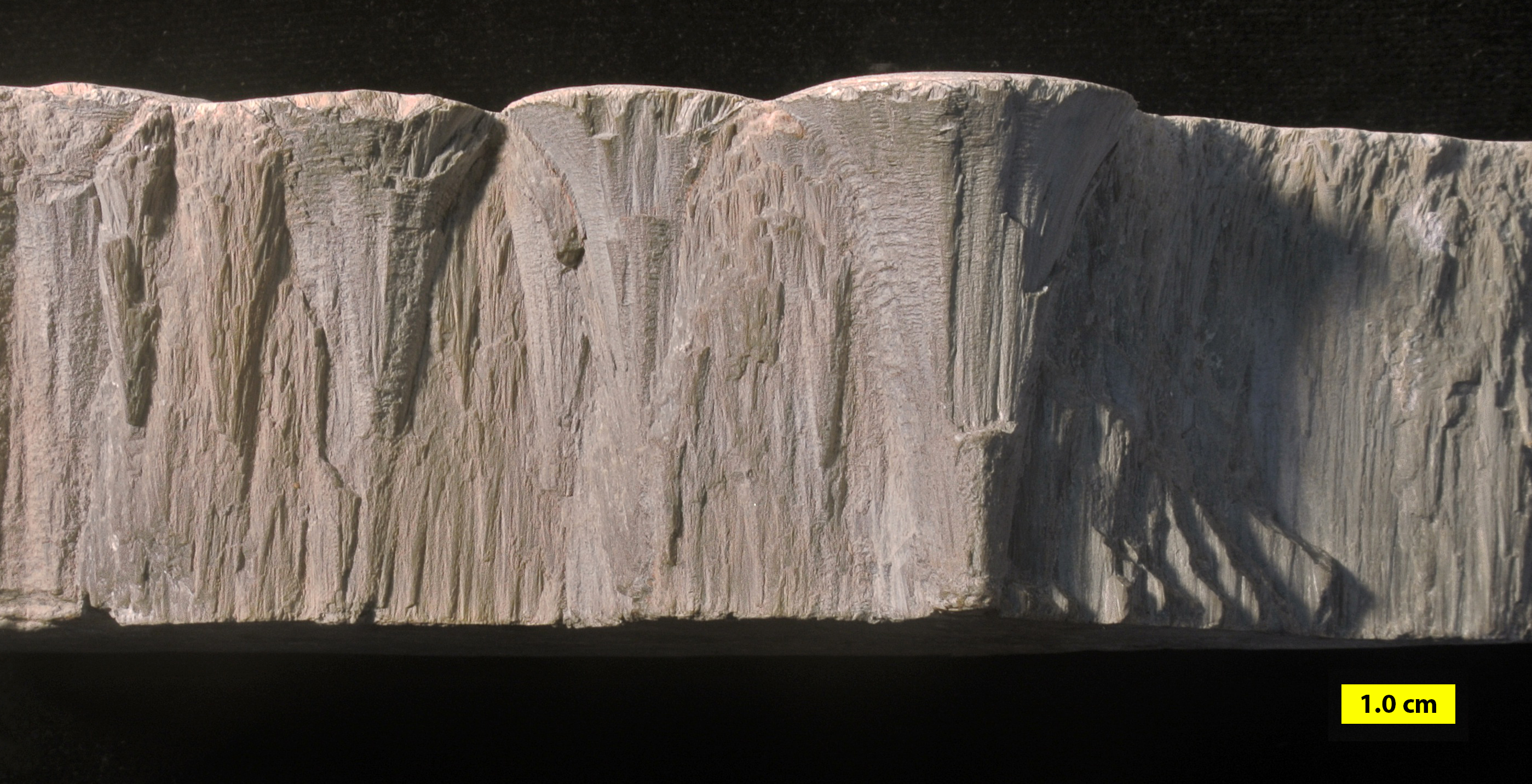
Cone-in-cone structures in limestone.

Cone-in-cone structures are secondary sedimentary structures that form in association with deeper burial and diagenesis. These vertically nested structures resemble those of tightly packed ice-cream cones stacked inside one another. They consist of concentric inter-bedded cones of calcite or more rarely gypsum, siderite or pyrite. Although several mechanisms may be responsible for the formation of cone-in-cone structures, the displacive crystal mechanism is preferred. It provides the most uniform and consistent explanation of growth and of why cone-in-cone can occur with such variable composition.

== Description ==
Cone-in-cone structures are identifiable by their distinctive conical appearance. They are composed of concentric cones nested inside each other. The actual composition of the cones is variable and dependent on the environment in which they were formed, with the majority of the cone-in-cone structures being composed of calcite with thin layers of clay between cones. There are also, more rarely, structures composed of siderite, gypsum, pyrite. Often the cone-in-cone will be found as features of calcite layers within a shale, and rarely within a dedolomite (calcitized dolomite).

Cone-in-cone structures should not be confused with either shatter cones such as are produced by meteorite impacts, or with shear cones like those developed in coals. Both these structures differ from cone-in-cone structures in that they are the product of very high instantaneous stresses. Thus they have a spatial dependence on impact areas for the former and fault zones for the latter, whereas cone-in-cone structures do not.

== Formation ==
The formation of cone-in-cone structures has been attributed to:

1. Volume increase inversion from aragonite to calcite in which expansion of conical aragonite pushed cones apart and allowed for clay to intrude
2. Burial-induced pressure solution and clay layers remaining as insoluble residues
3. Fracturing of crystalline mineral composites that form in over-pressured chambers, with fractures forming from a decrease in pore pressure
4. Formation during early diagenesis by expansive mineral growth (force of crystal growth), in which the cones are produced by the growth of cone-shaped aggregates of fibrous calcite, the clay layers originate as the crystals displace and disturb the original clay-rich sediment.
5. Gillman and Metzger proposed that their cone-in-cone structures were formed as a result that as fibrous aragonite grew, it displaced the still plastic clay materials. This is very similar to the displacive crystal growth mechanism proposed above in point number four. The displacive crystal growth mechanism tends to be the more popular and widely used explanation for cone-in-cone formation.

In all cases the common trend is for crystal formation to begin within partially consolidated sediment. As cone-in-cone formation happens it begins to take up more and more space within the sediment bed which begins to cause pressure. The pressure results in the cone shape, as parts of the structure are under greater or lesser pressures and grow differentially based on these varying pressures. The nature of displacement from crystal growth has led many to believe that most of the actual precipitation occurs very early during shallow burial. Some have concluded that, based upon ^{18}O depleted values from some of the cone-in-cone material that they can form later, perhaps at hundreds of meters of burial depth.

== History ==
Cone-in-cone structures have been known since the late 1700s, and people have attempted to explain the reasons for their formations. One of the earlier explanations was actually on par with the currently accepted methods for formation as discussed above. Some of the other methods offered for their formation were given by Shaub (1937). It was suggested that the formation of cone-in-cone resulted from volume shrinkage and slow dewatering of highly saturated and loosely packed materials. He suggests that partially developed conical surfaces are also possible as a result of pressure developed from overlying sediments under conditions where a unilateral release of horizontal pressure may become effective. He goes on to suggest that the current explanations of his time are inadequate to cover the structure and its formation. He even suggested that formation due to crystallization was not consistent. This growth due to crystallization is a significant portion of the currently accepted mode of formation.
