= Vegetation-induced sedimentary structures =

Vegetation-induced sedimentary structures (VISS) are primary sedimentary structures formed by the interaction of detrital sediment with in situ plants. VISS provide physical evidence of vegetation's fundamental role in mediating sediment accumulation and erosion in clastic depositional environments. VISS can be broken into seven types, five being hydrodynamic and two being decay-related. The simple hydrodynamic VISS are categorized by centroclinal cross strata, scratch semicircles and upturned beds. The complex hydrodynamic VISS are categorized by coalesced scour fills and scour-and-mound beds. The decay-related VISS are categorized by mudstone-filled hollows and downturned beds.

== Hydrodynamic structures ==
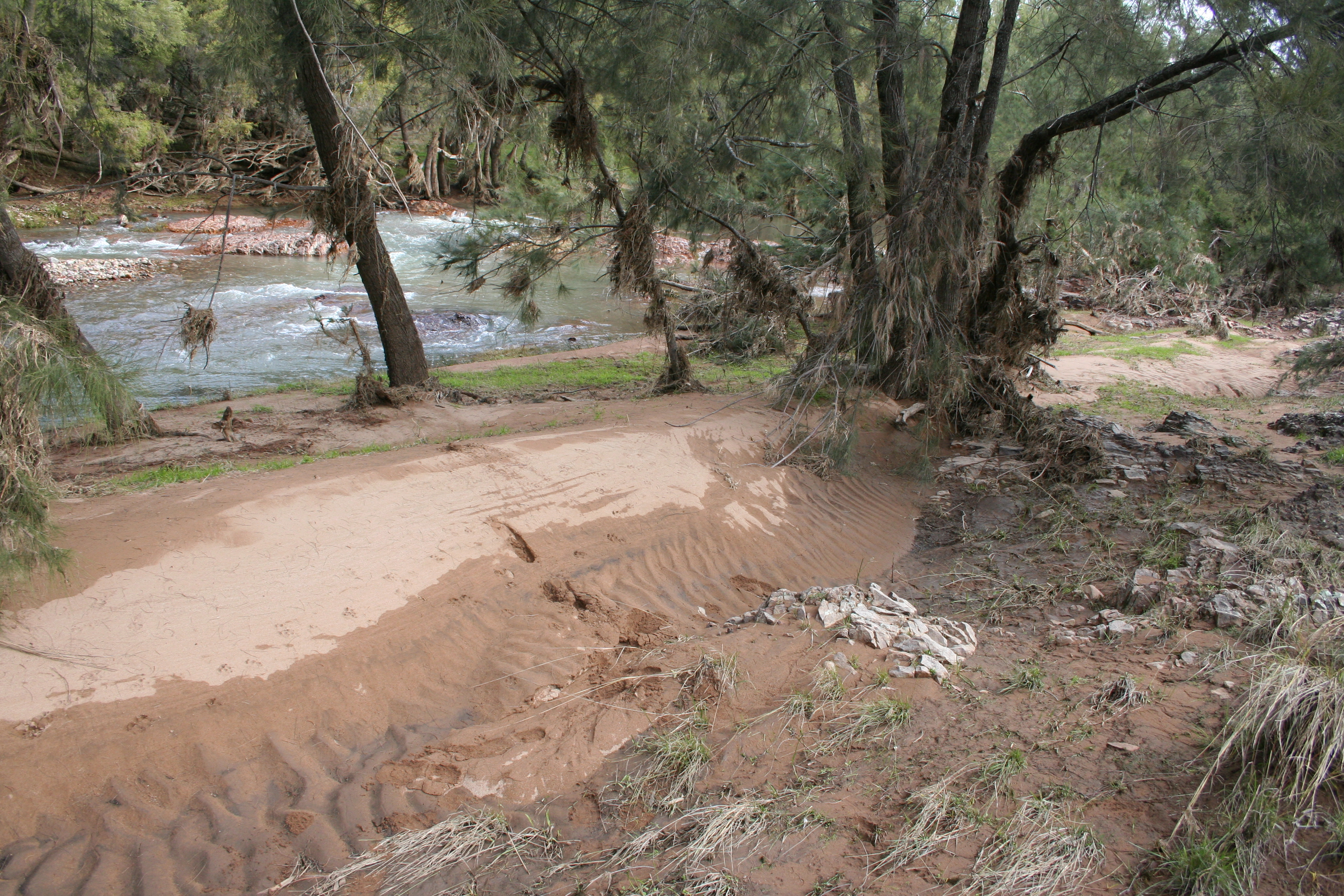
Sediment shadow, Rygel, M.C

=== Upturned beds (vegetation shadow) ===
Upturned beds are mounds of elongated sediment that are deposited on the lee (downflow) side of an obstruction, containing form-concordant stratification. These may also be described as tongue shaped. These beds are formed where plants were once standing and caused a decrease in bed shear, allowing sediment to deposit near their base. This commonly occurs with meandering flow that deposits sediment on the lee side of a plant. Sediment is also accumulated on the front and sides of an obstruction when deposition is high. The presence of upturned beds in cross-section is consistent with modern vegetation shadows.

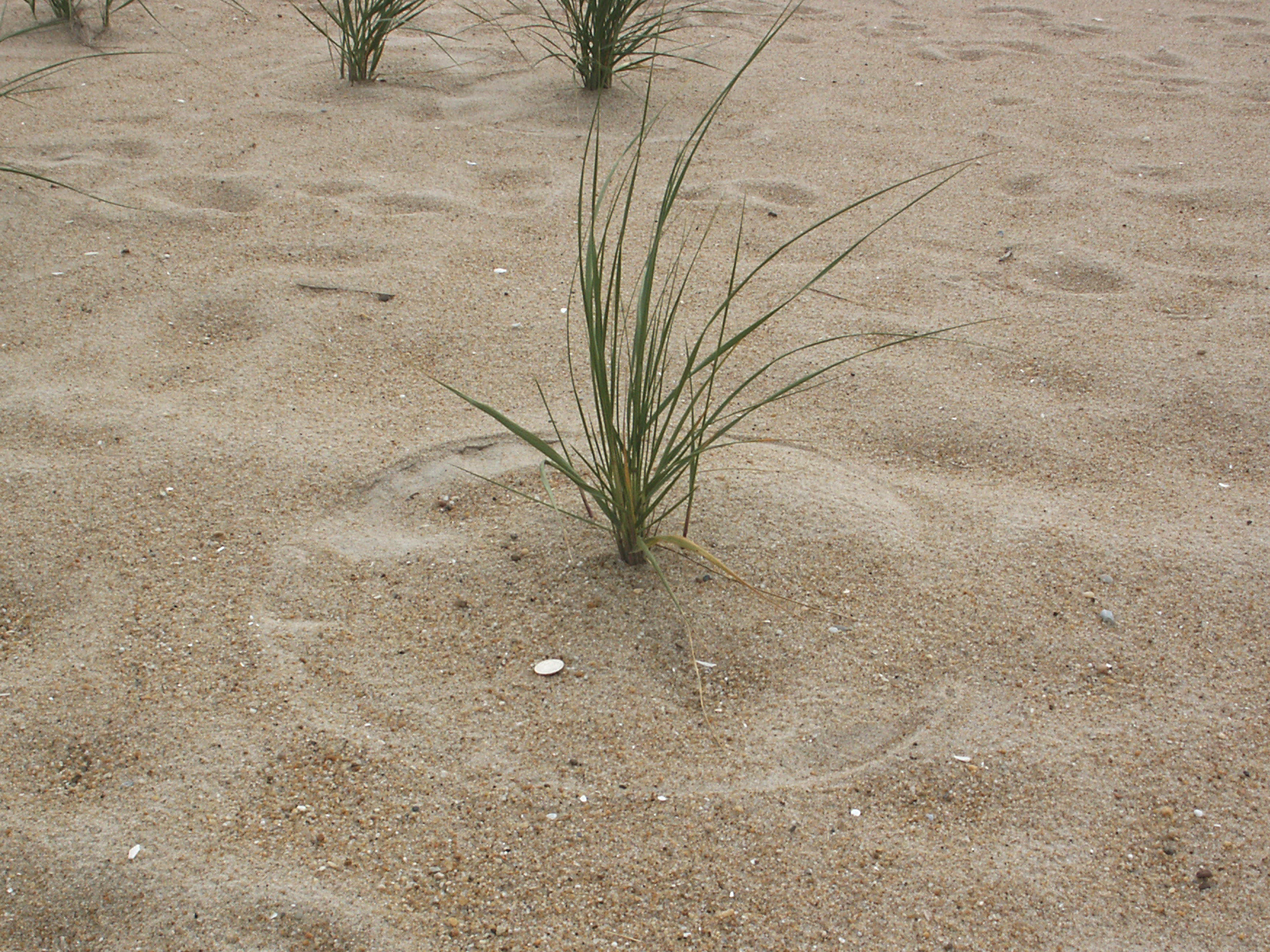
Scratch circle, Rygel, M.C

=== Scratch circles ===
Sets of concentric grooves that form in sand or mud by the action of sharp objects anchored at the center of a curvature set. Most likely formed from some sort of free moving plant under water. Plants are bent by the current, causing them to scratch concentric grooves into the adjacent substrate. The grooves are most likely formed in a muddy substrate, which preserved them during deposition of the overlying sediment. These scratch semicircles can record currents in wind or water during ancient deposition.

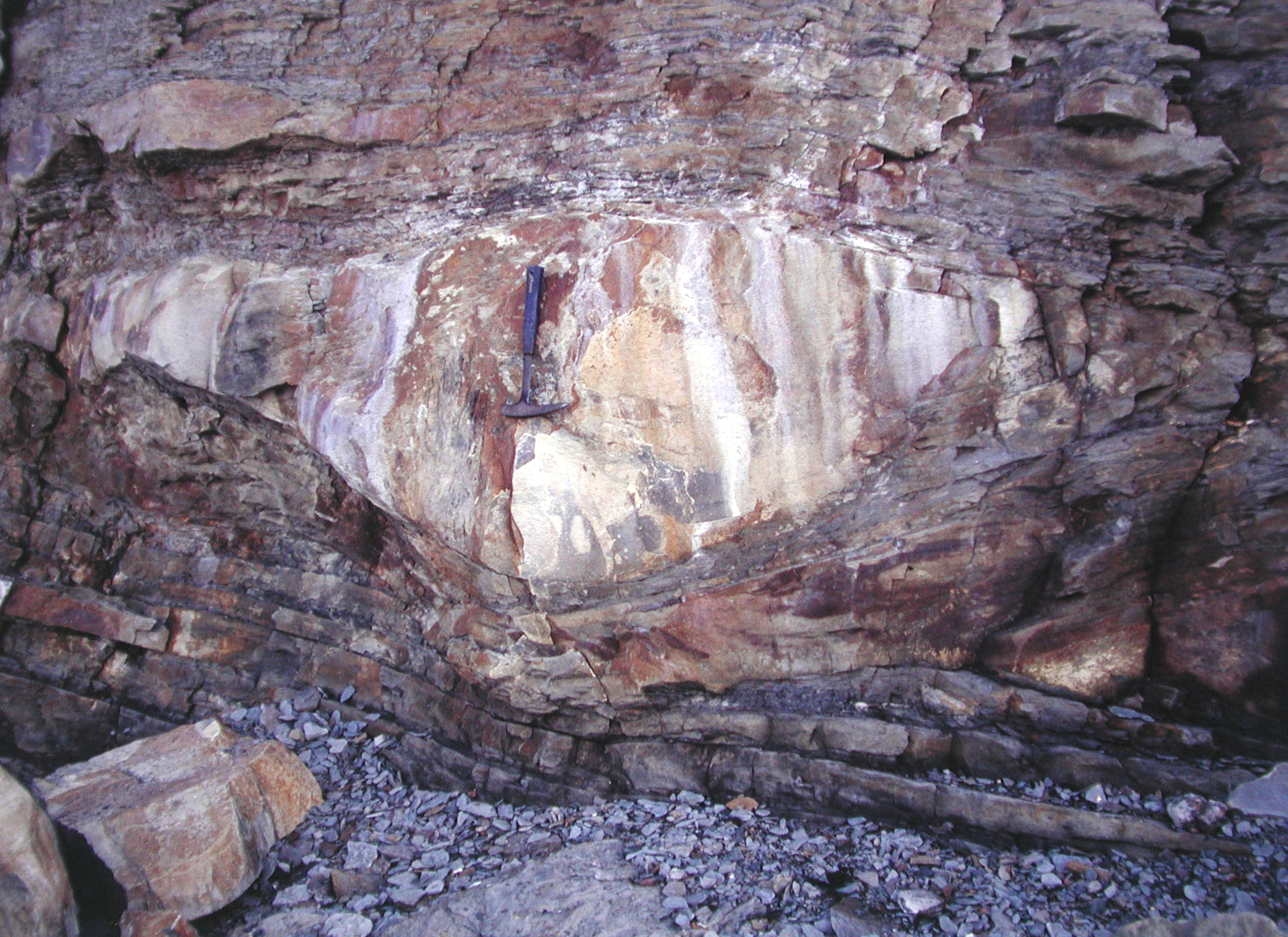
Centroclinal-cross-strata, Rygel, M.C

=== Centroclinal cross strata ===
Bodies of fine to very fine grained sand that fill symmetrical, cone shaped, depressions centered on tree trunks by swirling flood water. The fill is generally organized into form-concordant, concentric laminae that dip towards the tree. Centroclinal cross strata form from the infilling of scours created around trees by swirling flood water. Studies and piers show us just how the scouring process works. In front of these piers, decelerating flow and friction with the bed material causes a downward pressure gradient that leads to erosive downflow. Downflow is accompanied by horseshoe shaped sediment deposits that generate a U-shaped scour around the front and sides of the obstruction.

=== Scour-and-mound beds ===
Diffuse sandy lenses associated with standing vegetation at numerous horizons, within the poorly drained floodplain assemblage containing heterolithic bedding. These typically occur above rooted horizons. Scour-and-mound beds that are between sand and heterolithic bedding would suggests that they are formed in forested areas with standing water. Where sand charged flows rapidly decelerated and deposited large amounts of sediment with only minimal scour.

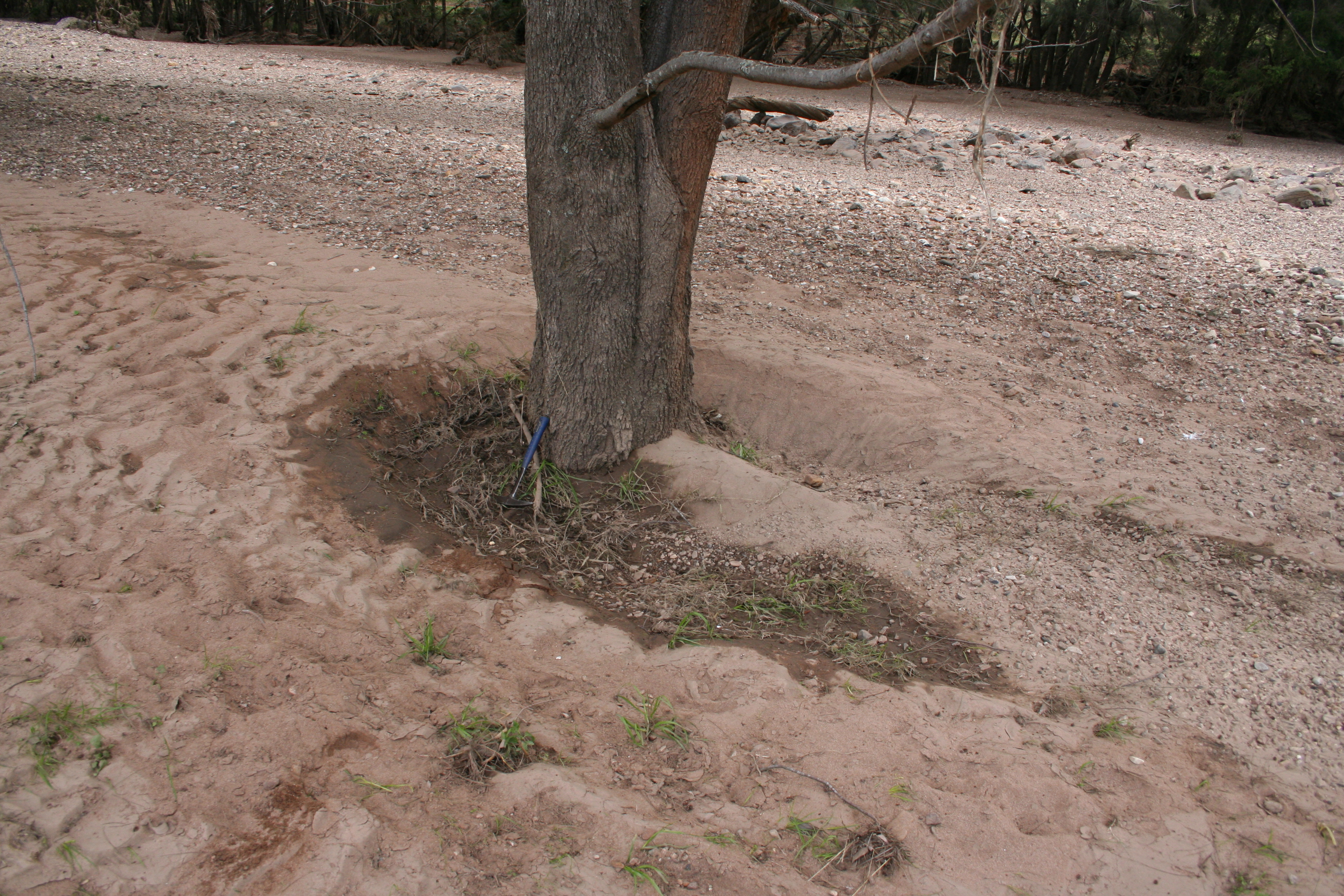
Tree scour, Rygel, M.C

=== Coalesced scour fills ===
Large, internally complex sandstone bodies in well-drained floodplain strata, which superficially resemble small channel bodies. These discrete, locally thickened accumulations are laterally equivalent to thin sheet (crevasse splay) sandstones and are strongly incised into red mudstones. Coalesced scour fills are strongly erosional structures formed where interconnected scours between trees are infilled with sandy sediment during waning flow. Strong incision into underlying strata and downflow tapering suggests that the precursor scours formed in response to vigorous floods across the well-drained floodplain. These essentially are unconstrained by channels and vegetation. The current flow carried only enough sand to fill the scour and blanket the floodplain with a thin sand layer.

== Decay-related structures ==
=== Downturned beds and mudstone-filled hollows ===
Sedimentary structures that appear to "protrude" into underlying strata. Most likely from the decay of entombed plants. These may have a "pothole-like" form. They reflect a prominent component of soft-sediment deformation in overlying and adjacent strata, but may also represent hydrodynamic activity around a plant that was not preserved.
