= Liesegang rings (geology) =

Colored cement bands in sedimentary rocks

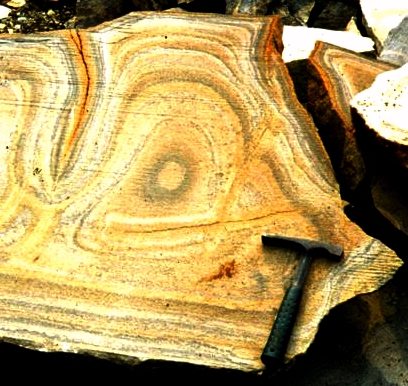
Typical Liesegang ring structures within cross-section

Liesegang rings (/ˈliːzəɡɑːŋ/; also called Liesegangen rings or Liesegang bands) are colored bands of cement observed in sedimentary rocks that typically cut across bedding. These secondary (diagenetic) sedimentary structures exhibit bands of (authigenic) minerals that are arranged in a regular repeating pattern. Liesegang rings are distinguishable from other sedimentary structures by their concentric or ring-like appearance. The precise mechanism from which Liesegang rings form is not entirely known and is still under research, but there is a precipitation process that is thought to be the catalyst for Liesegang ring formation, referred to as the Ostwald-Liesegang supersaturation-nucleation-depletion cycle. Though Liesegang rings are considered a frequent occurrence in sedimentary rocks, rings composed of iron oxide can also occur in permeable igneous and metamorphic rocks that have been chemically weathered.

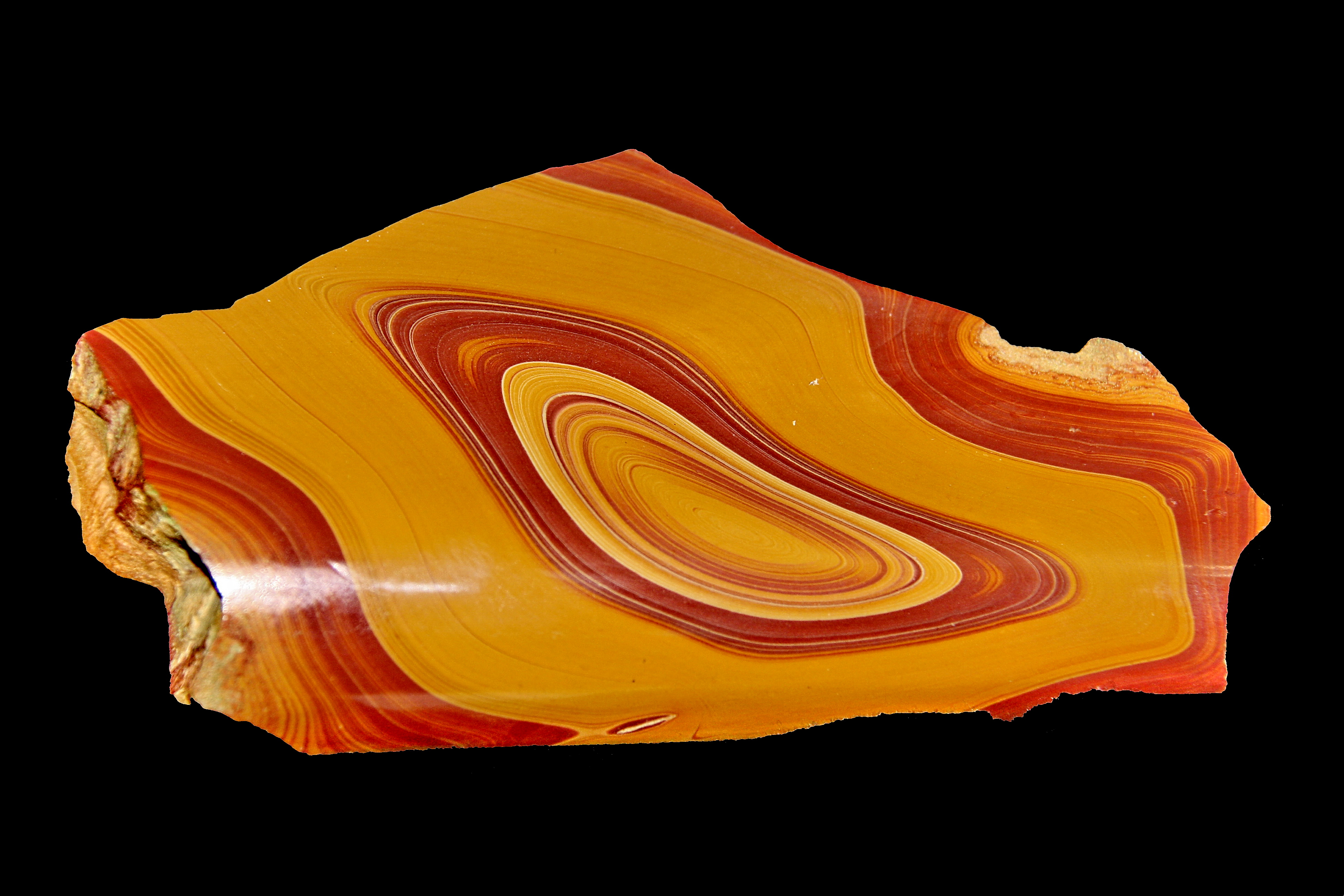
Liesegang Rings in Volcano-sedimentary Rock from the Gobi Desert of Mongolia. Polished sample 15x9 cm.

== History ==
In 1896, a German chemist named Raphael E. Liesegang first described Liesegang banding in his observations from the results of an experiment, and Wilhelm Ostwald provided the earliest explanation for the phenomenon. The purpose of Liesegang's experiment was to observe precipitate formation resulting from the chemical reaction produced when a drop of silver nitrate solution was placed onto the surface of potassium dichromate gel. The resultant precipitate of silver dichromate formed a concentric pattern of rings. Liesegang and successive other workers observed the behavior of precipitates forming rings in sedimentary rocks, hence these features became known as Liesegang rings.

Note that what's almost universally referred to as “Liesegang banding”, representing precipitation lines of iron-rich minerals (e.g., hematite, limonite, goethite, etc.) at and along groundwater chemical interfaces. But, according to Neil Wells of Kent State University, the original concept of Liesegang banding does not match up with what is seen in the rock record.

== Mechanism for development ==
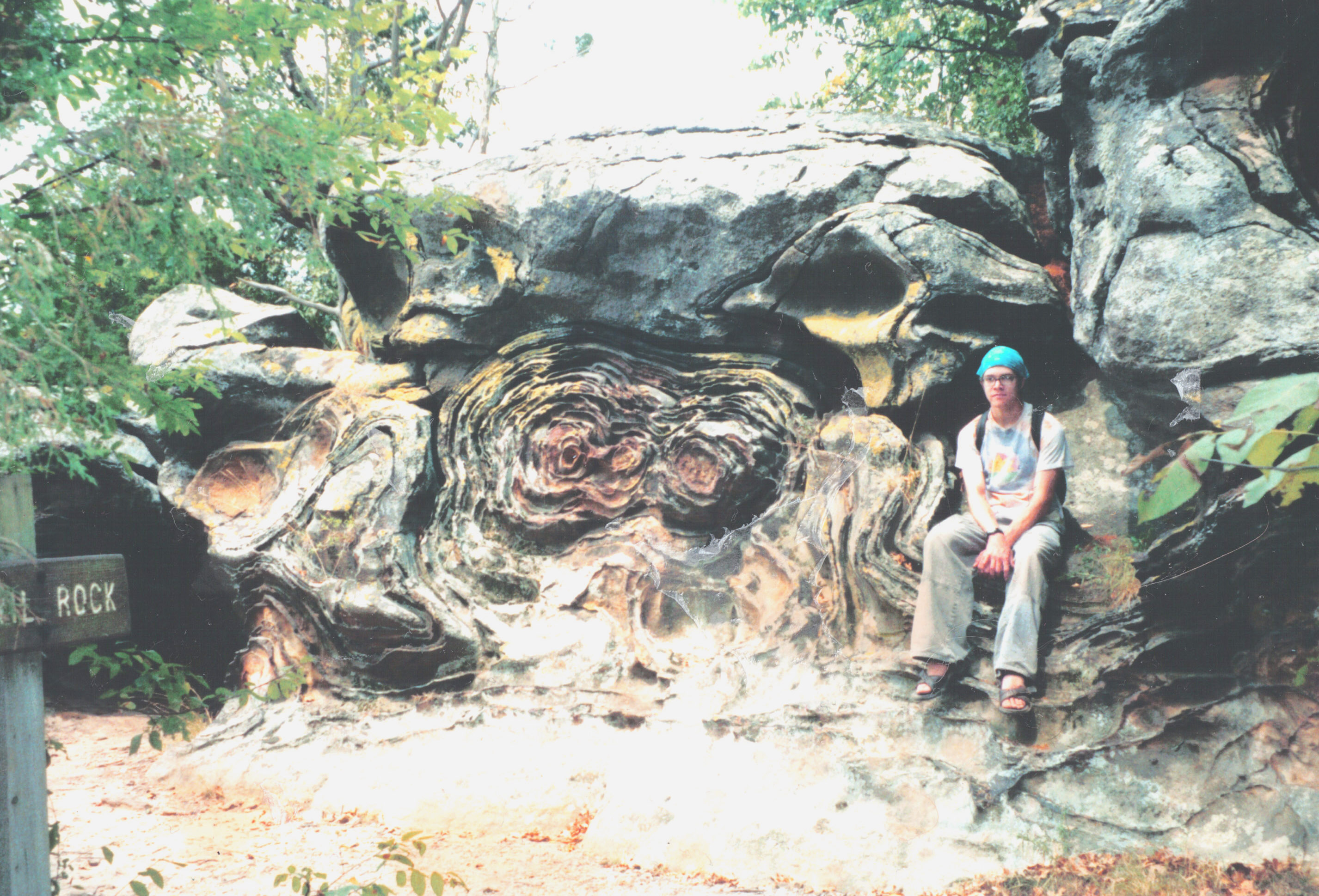
Anvil rock in the Shawnee National Forest, Illinois

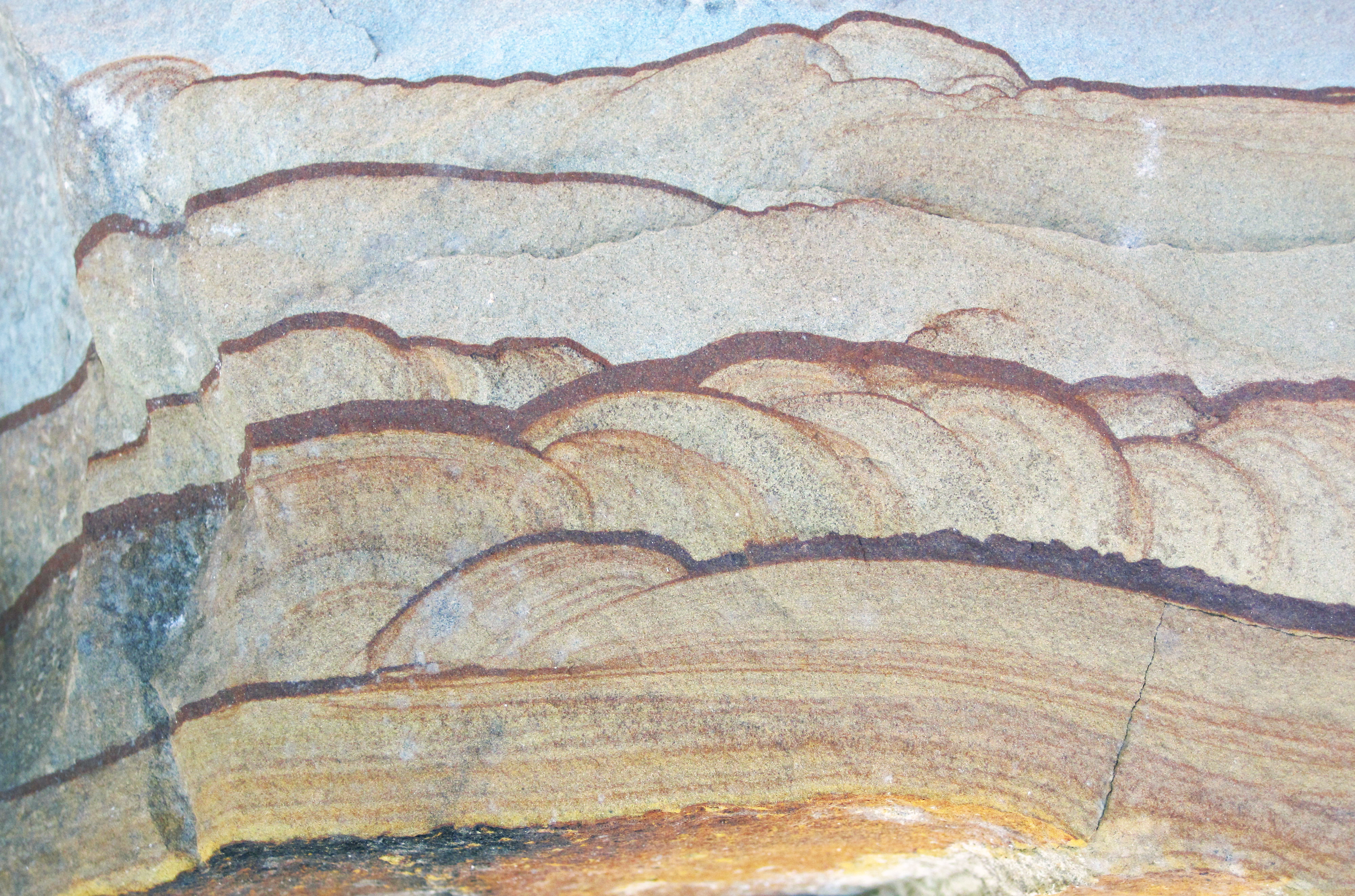
"Liesegang banding" in sandstone northwest of Nellie, Ohio

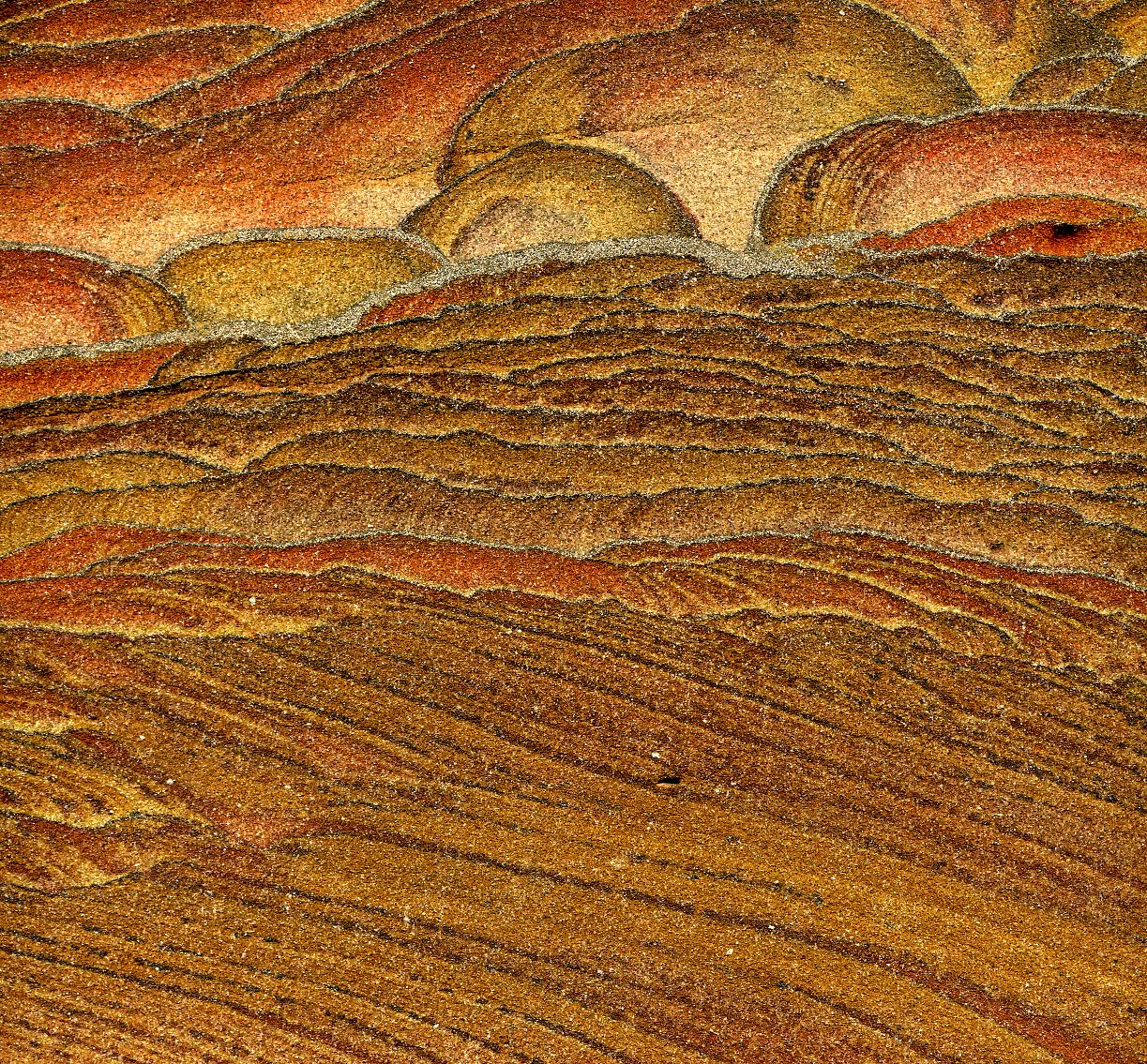
“Liesegang banding” developed in a quartzose sandstone AKA “Scenic Sandstone”.

The process by which Liesegang rings develop is not completely understood. Liesegang rings may form from the chemical segregation of iron oxides and other minerals during weathering. One popular mechanism suggested by geochemists is that Liesegang rings develop when there is a lack of convection (advection) and has to do with the inter-diffusion of reacting species such as oxygen and ferrous iron that precipitate in separate discrete bands which become spaced apart in a geometric pattern. A process of precipitation known as the Ostwald-Liesegang supersaturation-nucleation-depletion cycle is known by the geologic community as a probable mechanism for Liesegang ring formation in sedimentary rocks. In this process the "...diffusion of reactants leads to supersaturation and nucleation; this precipitation results in localized band formation and depletion of reactants in adjacent zones." As Ostwald suggests, there is a localized formation of crystal seeds that occurs when the right level of supersaturation is reached, and once the crystal seeds form, the growth of the crystals is believed to lower the supersaturation level of fluids in pore spaces surrounding the crystals, thus mineralization that occurs after the initial crystal growth in the surrounding areas develops in bands or rings. One classic example based on the Ostwald-Liesegang hypothesis is observed in water and rock interactions where iron hydroxide precipitates in sandstone through pore space.

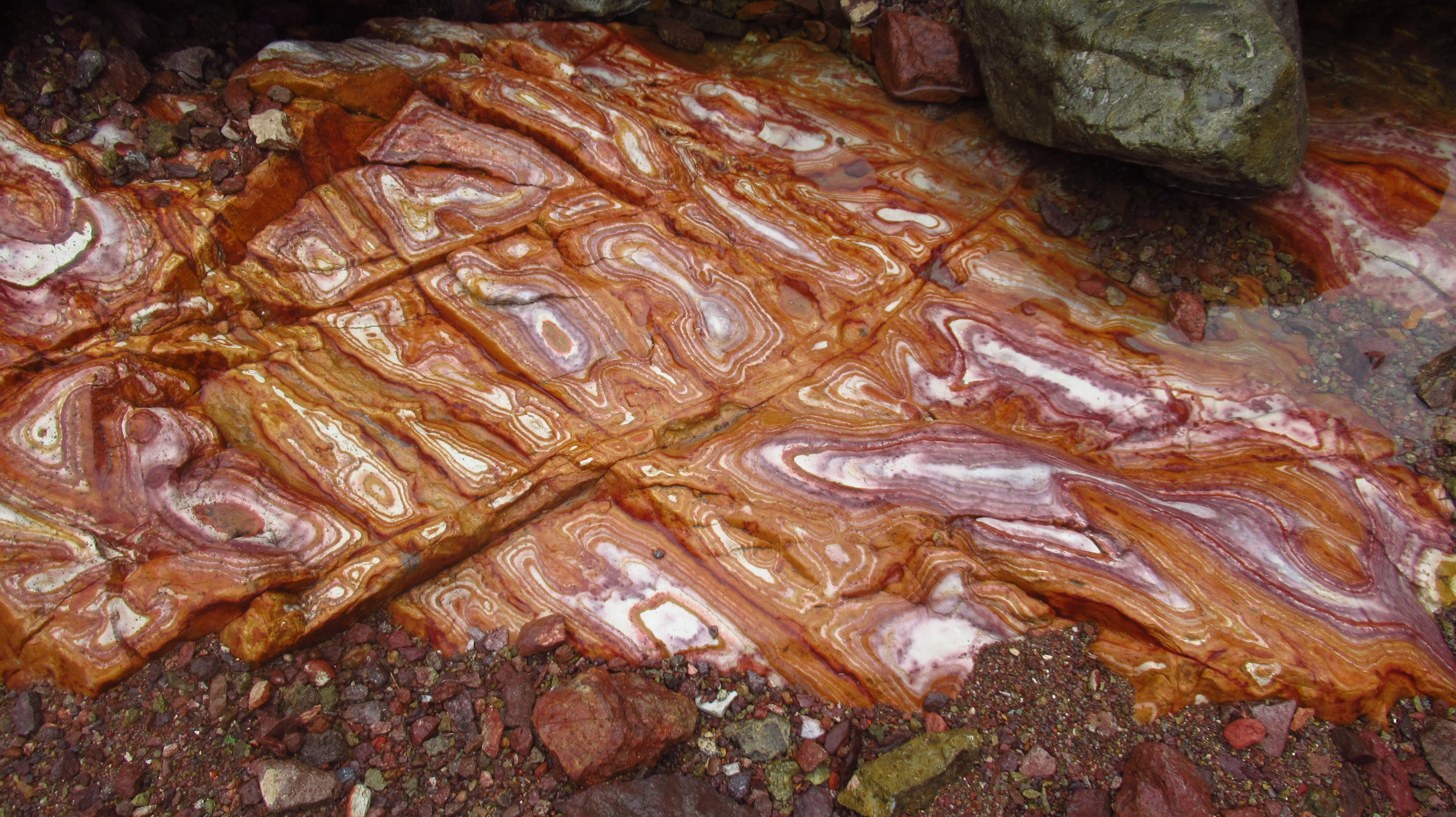
Liesegang rings in rhyolite (Kofa Mountains, SW Arizona)

== Occurrence in the environment ==
Liesegang ring patterns are considered to be secondary (diagenetic) sedimentary structures, though they are also found in permeable igneous and metamorphic rocks that have been chemically weathered. Chemical weathering of rocks that leads to the formation of Liesegang rings typically involves the diffusion of oxygen in subterranean water into pore space containing soluble ferrous iron. Liesegang rings usually cut across layers of stratification and occur in many types of rock, some of which more commonly include sandstone and chert. Though there is a high occurrence of Liesegang rings in sedimentary rocks, relatively few scientists have studied their mineralogy and texture in enough detail to write more about them. Liesegang rings are referred to as examples of geochemical self-organization, meaning that their distribution in the rock does not seem to be directly related to features that were established prior to Liesegang ring formation. For instance, in certain types of sedimentary rocks such as carbonate siltstones (calcisiltites), Liesegang ring patterns can be misinterpreted for faults; the rings may appear to be "offset," however the laminae in the rock exhibit an unbroken pattern, therefore the observed offset is attributed to pseudofaulting. Pseudofaults are the result of Liesegang rings developing within areas of the rock that are adjacent to each other but at varying stratigraphic levels. Liesegang rings can have the appearance of fine lamination and can be mistaken for laminae when parallel or subparallel to the bedding plane, and are more easily differentiated from laminae when the rings are observed cutting across beds or lamination.
