= Herringbone cross-stratification =

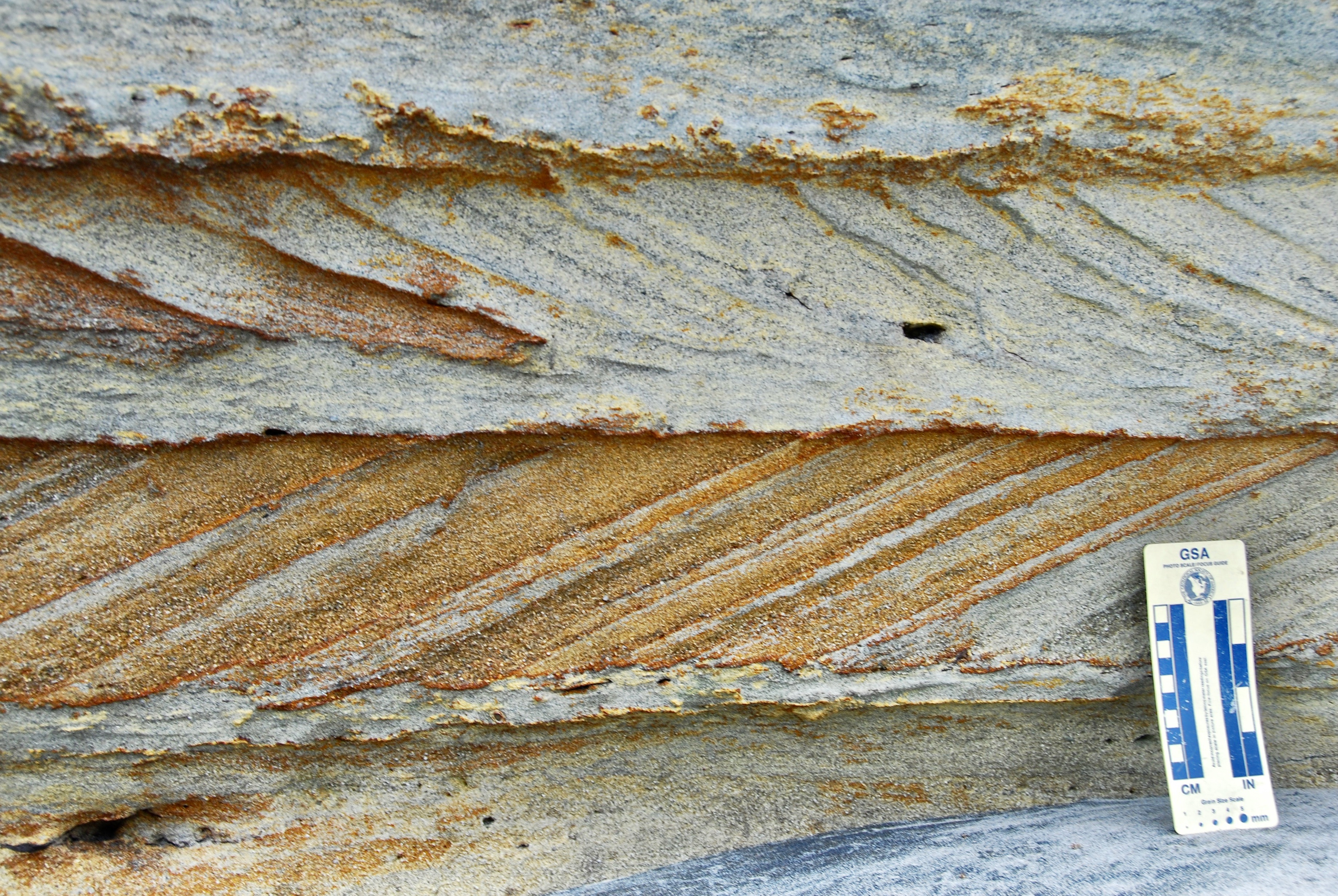
Herringbone cross stratification in tidal channel, Eocene Delmar Formation, California

Herringbone cross-stratification is a type of sedimentary structure formed in tidal areas, such as tidal flats, where the current periodically flows in the opposite direction.

== Formation ==
During the conventional formation process of cross-stratification, sand grains saltate up the upstream side of the dune, collecting at the peak until the angle of repose is reached. At this point, the crest of granular material has grown too large and will be overcome by the force of the depositing fluid, falling down the downstream side of the dune. Repeated avalanches will eventually form the sedimentary structure known as cross-stratification, with the structure dipping in the direction of the paleocurrent.

In tidal areas, which have bidirectional flow, structures are formed with alternating layers of cross-beds dipping in opposite directions that reflect the alternating paleocurrent. These sedimentary structures are not common because they require the current to be equal in both directions, which rarely happens in nature. The time period represented by each cross-stratified layer is likely to be many years.

The pattern of the structure is said to resemble the backbone structure of a herring fish.
