= Muffin (disambiguation) =

A muffin is a small quick bread.

Muffin may also refer to:

== Arts and entertainment ==
=== Fictional characters ===
- Muffin the Mule, puppet character in British television programs for children
- Charlie Muffin, a 1979 TV film, and its protagonist
- Muffin Lovebird, a fictional character in the British TV programme 3rd & Bird
- Muffin Heeler, a fictional character in TV series Bluey
- Muffins, also known as Derpy Hooves, a character from My Little Pony: Friendship Is Magic

=== Music and film ===
- Muffin Films, Flash animation company
- Muffins, a 1997 EP by Hoobastank
- "Muffins", a 2006 video by Liam Kyle Sullivan
- The Muffins, 1970s American band

== Other uses ==
- Muffin (software), a fork of Mutter
- English muffin, a small yeast-leavened bread
- Muffin Spencer-Devlin (born 1953), American golfer

== See also ==
- Muffin top (disambiguation)
- The Muffin Man (disambiguation)
- Muffin Butte, a summit in Utah, US
- Muffin Islands, an island in Alaska, US
- Muffing, a sex act involving the inguinal canals
