= Aztec Butte =

Rock formation in Utah, United States

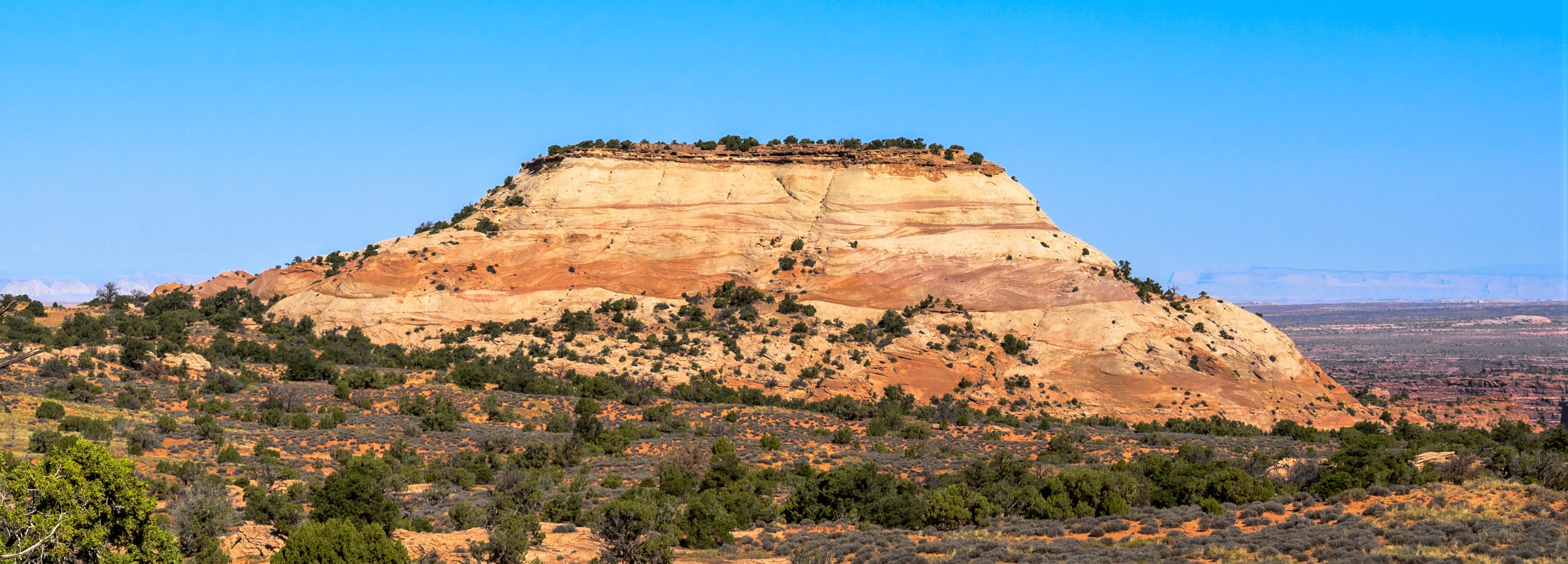
- Southeast aspect, seen from Mesa Arch Trail

Highest point
- Elevation: 6,312 ft (1,924 m)
- Prominence: 232 ft (71 m)
- Parent peak: Shaft Benchmark (6,329 ft)
- Isolation: 1.54 mi (2.48 km)
- Coordinates: 38°23′51″N 109°52′26″W

Geography
- Location within Utah Location within the United States
- Country: United States
- State: Utah
- County: San Juan
- Protected area: Canyonlands National Park
- Parent range: Colorado Plateau
- Topo map: USGS Musselman Arch

Geology
- Rock age: Jurassic
- Rock type: Navajo Sandstone

Climbing
- Easiest route: class 3 scrambling

Aztec Butte is a sandstone summit, elevation 6,312 feet (1,924 meters), located in the Island in the Sky District of Canyonlands National Park, in San Juan County, Utah. Aztec Butte is composed of white cross-bedded Navajo Sandstone, which is the remains of wind-borne sand dunes deposited approximately 170 million years ago during the Jurassic Period. It resembles the Pyramid of the Sun in Mexico, which was built by the Aztecs.

Ancestral Puebloan people traveled to the Island in the Sky area to hunt and gather seeds, then stored their food in stone granaries near the top of Aztec Butte. These well-preserved granaries date to AD 1200–1300. A half-mile hiking trail through flat grassland, followed by a quarter-mile scramble with 200 feet vertical gain, leads to the top of the butte and the granaries. The trailhead is located alongside the road to Upheaval Dome. In addition to Upheaval Dome, other nearby attractions include Mesa Arch which is situated less than 1 mi (1.6 km) to the southeast, Muffin Butte to the south, Green River Overlook to the southwest, and Trail Canyon to the north. Precipitation runoff from Aztec Butte drains to the Green River.

== Gallery ==
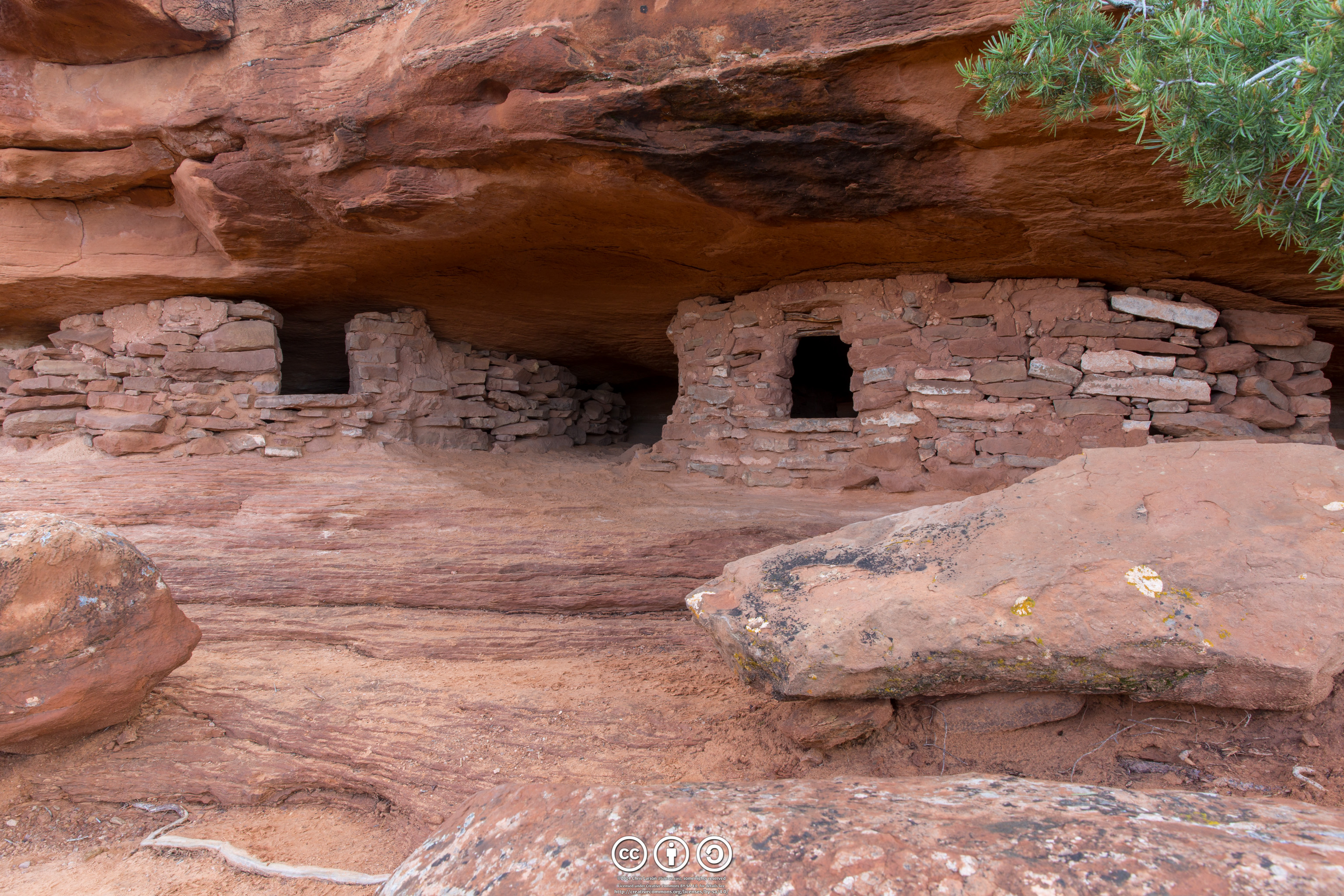
Aztec Butte granary

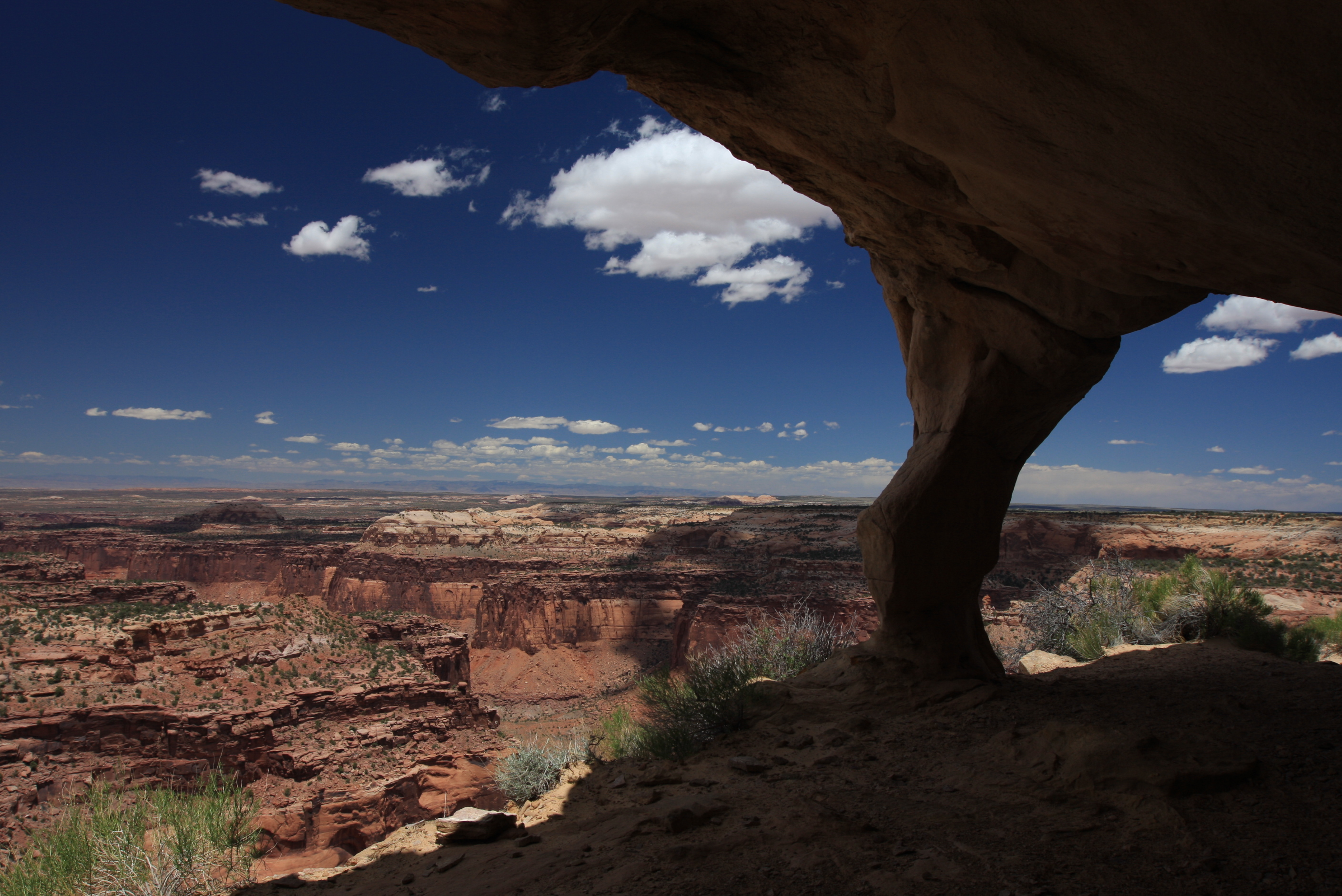

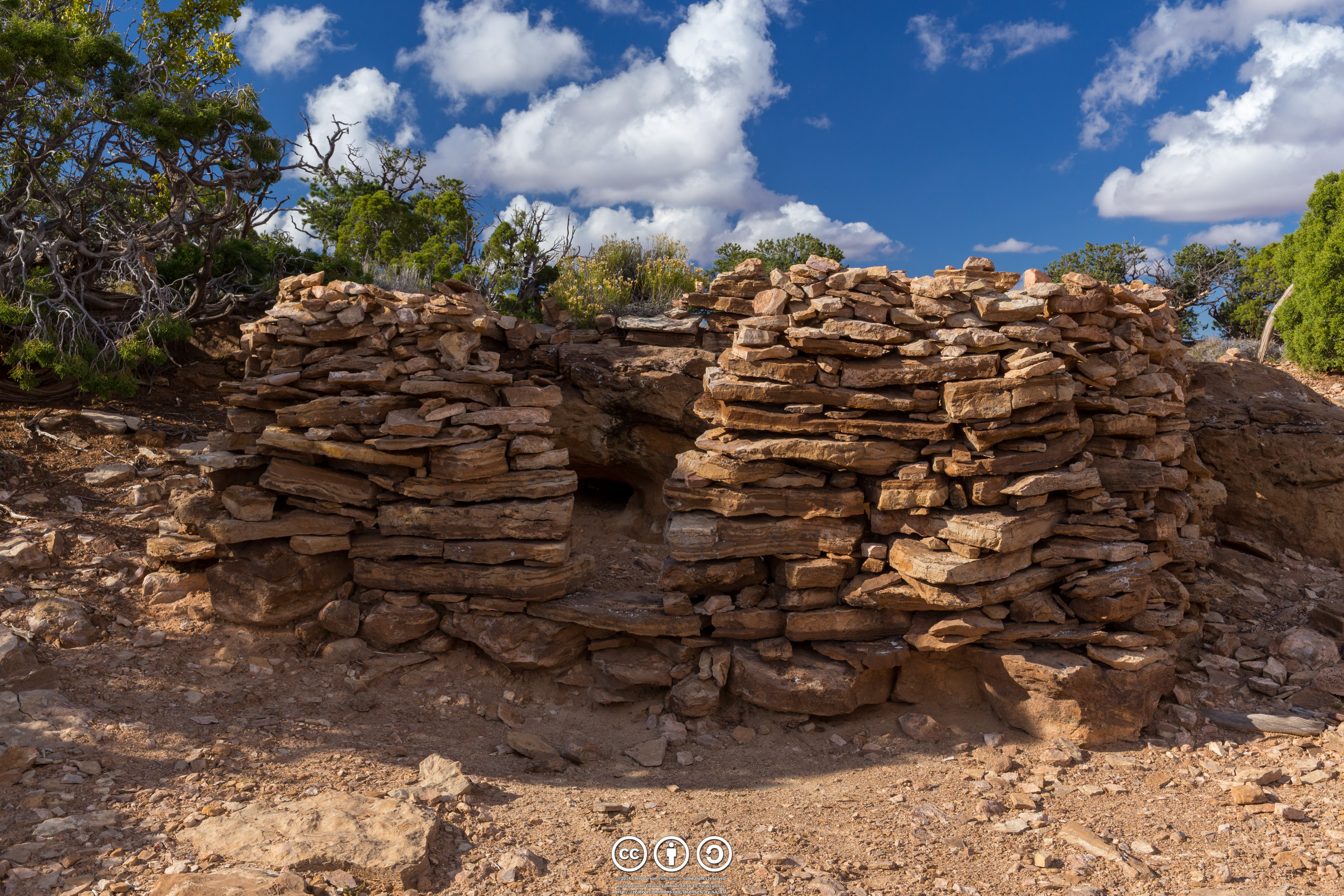

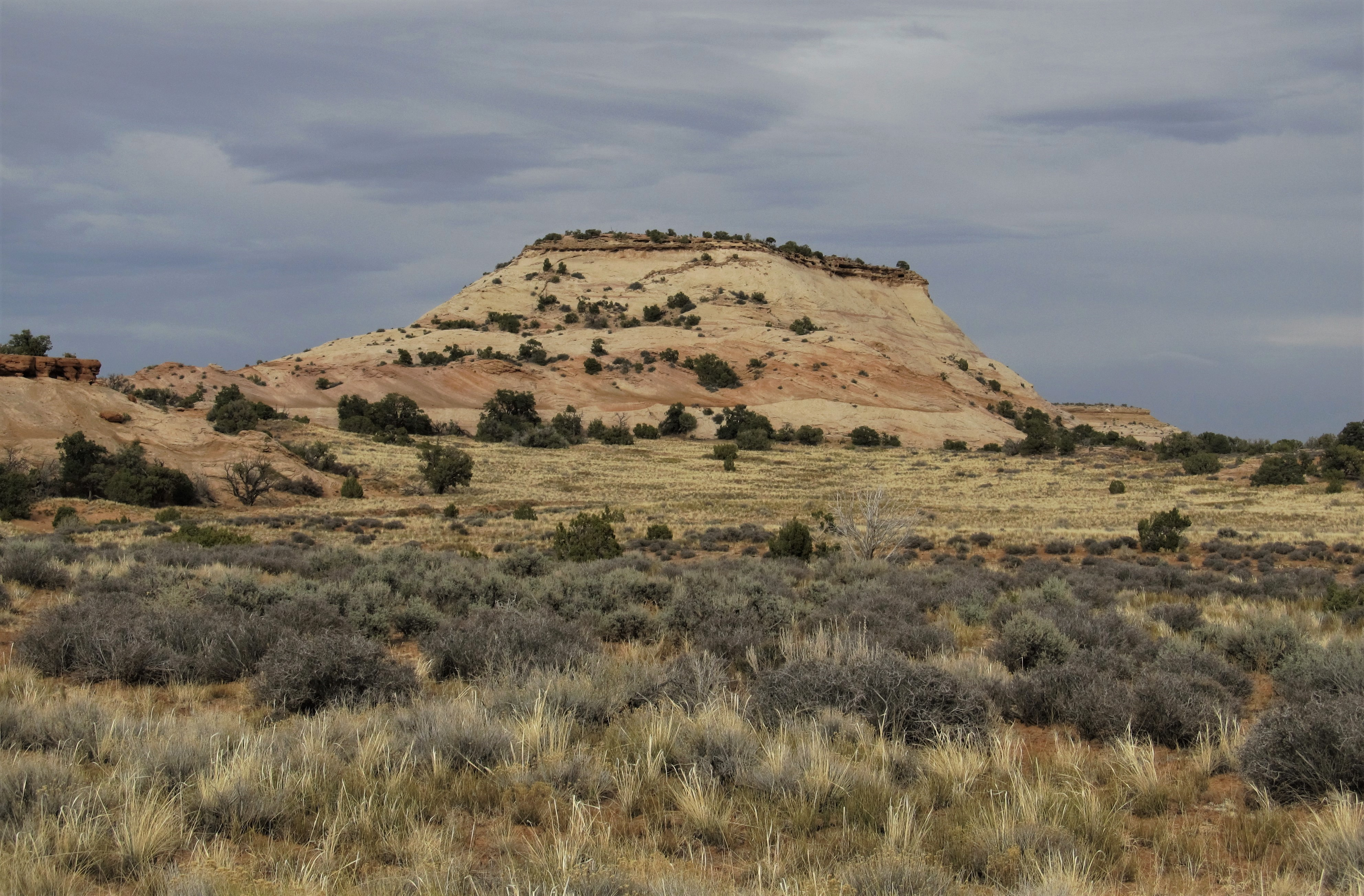

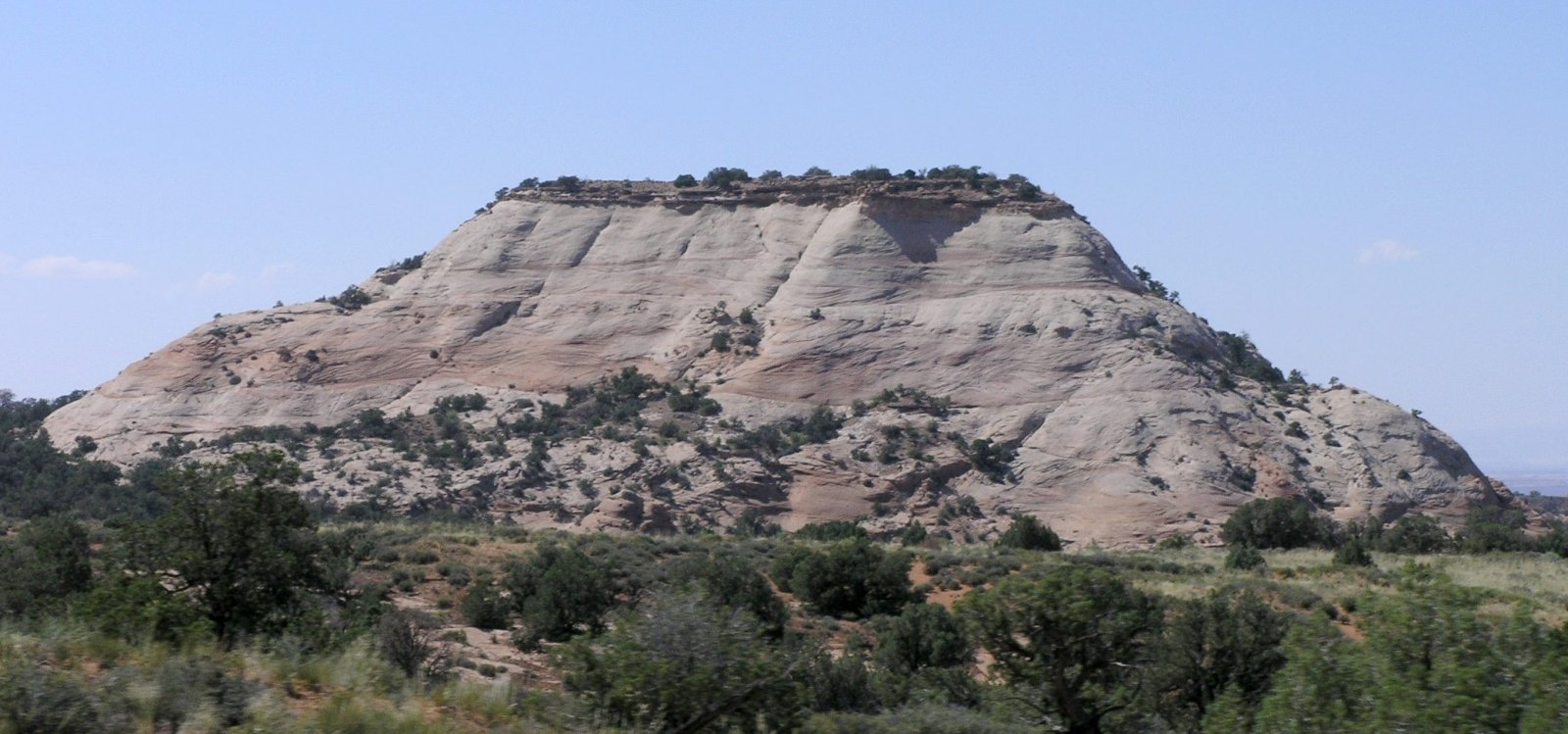

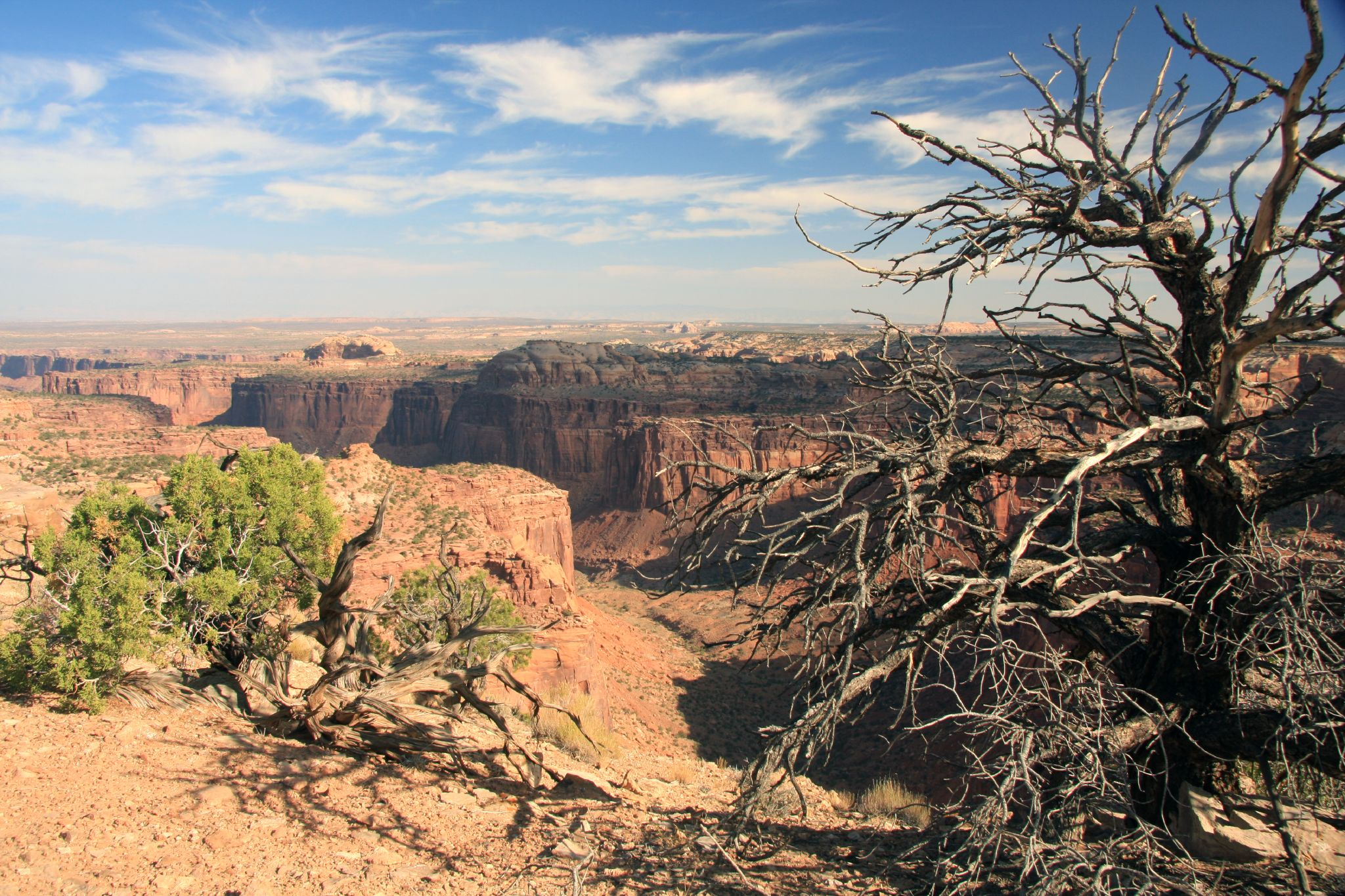

== Climate ==
Spring and fall are the most favorable seasons to visit Aztec Butte. According to the Köppen climate classification system, it is located in a Cold semi-arid climate zone, which is defined by the coldest month having an average mean temperature below −0 °C (32 °F) and at least 50% of the total annual precipitation being received during the spring and summer. This desert climate receives less than 10 inches (250 millimeters) of annual rainfall, and snowfall is generally light during the winter.

Climate data for Island in the Sky Visitor Center, elevation 5,666 ft (1,727 m), 1981-2010 normals, extremes 1981-2019
Month	Jan	Feb	Mar	Apr	May	Jun	Jul	Aug	Sep	Oct	Nov	Dec	Year
Record high °F (°C)	58.6 (14.8)	69.0 (20.6)	79.8 (26.6)	86.1 (30.1)	98.5 (36.9)	103.9 (39.9)	106.4 (41.3)	101.1 (38.4)	97.9 (36.6)	86.9 (30.5)	71.0 (21.7)	59.2 (15.1)	106.4 (41.3)
Mean daily maximum °F (°C)	38.1 (3.4)	44.1 (6.7)	54.9 (12.7)	63.5 (17.5)	74.2 (23.4)	85.4 (29.7)	91.7 (33.2)	88.7 (31.5)	79.5 (26.4)	65.8 (18.8)	49.7 (9.8)	38.1 (3.4)	64.6 (18.1)
Mean daily minimum °F (°C)	20.8 (−6.2)	25.8 (−3.4)	33.3 (0.7)	40.0 (4.4)	49.5 (9.7)	59.8 (15.4)	66.0 (18.9)	63.9 (17.7)	54.9 (12.7)	42.5 (5.8)	31.1 (−0.5)	21.3 (−5.9)	42.5 (5.8)
Record low °F (°C)	−8.0 (−22.2)	−12.4 (−24.7)	10.4 (−12.0)	16.3 (−8.7)	26.0 (−3.3)	28.7 (−1.8)	46.0 (7.8)	50.2 (10.1)	27.6 (−2.4)	9.2 (−12.7)	6.2 (−14.3)	−9.4 (−23.0)	−12.4 (−24.7)
Average precipitation inches (mm)	0.53 (13)	0.50 (13)	0.76 (19)	0.72 (18)	0.70 (18)	0.45 (11)	0.93 (24)	1.04 (26)	1.06 (27)	1.30 (33)	0.70 (18)	0.58 (15)	9.27 (235)
Average dew point °F (°C)	18.6 (−7.4)	21.8 (−5.7)	23.3 (−4.8)	25.7 (−3.5)	29.5 (−1.4)	32.7 (0.4)	41.2 (5.1)	45.1 (7.3)	37.6 (3.1)	29.5 (−1.4)	23.2 (−4.9)	17.9 (−7.8)	28.9 (−1.7)
Source: PRISM

== See also ==
- Colorado Plateau
- Geology of the Canyonlands area
