= Muffin rings =

Thin metal rings used while cooking muffins

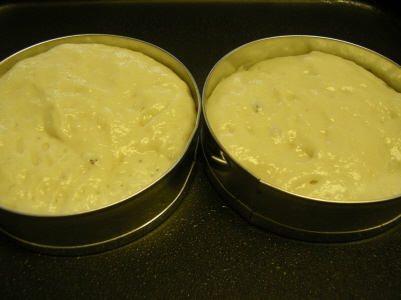
English muffin dough cooking on a griddle in muffin rings

Muffin rings are metal cookware used for oven-baking or griddle-cooking muffins or English muffins. Muffin rings are circle-shaped objects made of thin metal. The rings are about one inch high. Batter is poured into the rings, which are placed on a griddle. The griddle is then baked in an oven. The muffins and the ring are turned over midway through the baking to bake the other side of the muffin.

== History ==
Dollar Monthly Magazine in 1864 states that muffin rings were used with griddles. First the griddle was heated and greased with pork fat. An 1861 article states that once the yeast-based dough was prepared, it was molded, allowed to sit for a while, and then placed in buttered muffin rings which were placed on the griddle. Godey's Lady's Book and Magazine states that the muffins and rings were turned over with a thin tool resembling a palette knife. The American author Parloa states that muffin pans, cups or tins should be used rather than muffin rings, since at the time she was writing, muffin rings have faded in popularity.

== See also ==
- Muffin
- English muffin
