= The Muffin Man (disambiguation) =

The Muffin Man is a nursery rhyme.

The Muffin Man may also refer to:

- "Muffin Man" (song), by Frank Zappa
- Muffin Men, a British band
- "Muffin' Man", TV series episode, see list of The Sarah Silverman Program episodes
- The Muffin Man, a minor character in the Shrek franchise
- Henrik Christiansen (swimmer), a Norwegian swimmer dubbed "Olympic Muffin Man"
- Steve Hine, darts player nicknamed "The Muffin Man"
