= Muffin top (disambiguation) =

Muffin top is a slang term for a person's body fat that extends over the edges of the waistline of clothes.

Muffin top or muffin tops may also refer to:

- the top of a muffin, the crisp upper part of the baked product
- "The Muffin Tops", an episode of the TV sitcom Seinfeld
- Muffin Top: A Love Story, a 2014 American romantic comedy
