= Foreset bed =

Part of a river delta

A foreset bed is one of the main parts of a river delta. It is the inclined part of a delta that is found at the end of the stream channel as the delta sediment is deposited along the arcuate delta front. As the sediments are deposited on a sloping surface the resulting bedding is not horizontal, but dips in the direction of current flow toward deeper water. A cross-section of a delta shows the cross bedding in the direction of stream flow into the still water.

The foreset bed is formed when a stream carrying sediment meets still water. When the stream meets the still water, the velocity of the water is decreased enough so that the larger sediment particles can no longer be carried and are therefore deposited. The deposited sediment builds up over time, and a delta is formed.
