= English muffin =

Small, round, flat yeast-leavened bread

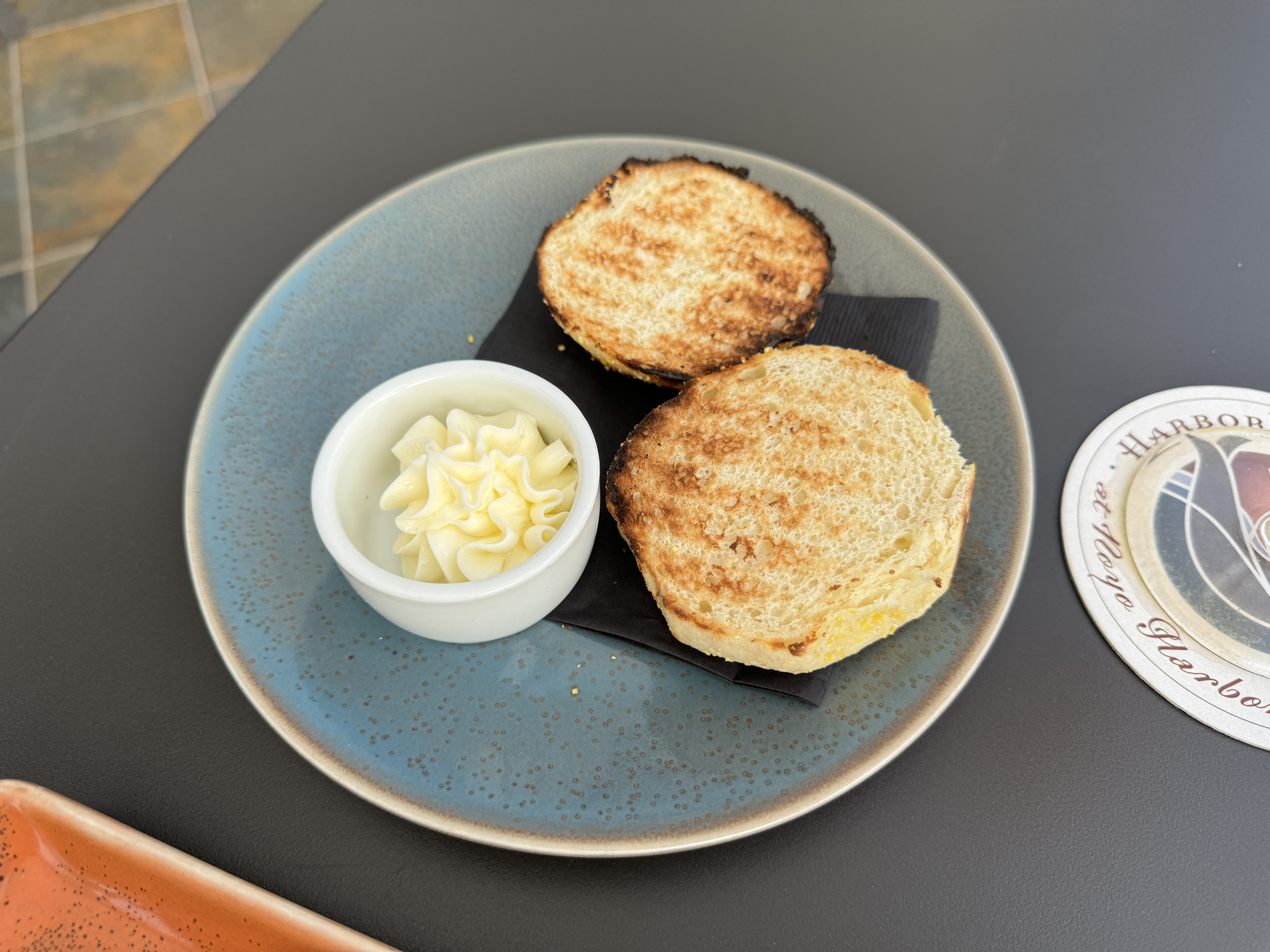
- A split and toasted English muffin
- Alternative names: Breakfast muffin, flatbread muffin
- Type: Leavened bread
- Course: Breakfast
- Place of origin: England
- Main ingredients: Wheat flour, yeast
- Variations: Raisin, whole wheat, multigrain, cranberry, apple cinnamon

An English muffin is a small, round, flat yeast-leavened (sometimes sourdough) bread which is commonly about 4 in (10 cm) in diameter and 1.5 in (4 cm) tall. It is generally split horizontally and served toasted. They are unsweetened and frequently eaten with sweet or savoury toppings, such as butter, fruit jam, honey, eggs, sausage, bacon, or cheese. English muffins are an essential ingredient in eggs Benedict and a variety of breakfast sandwiches derived from it, such as the McMuffin.

Rather than being entirely oven-baked, they are also cooked in a griddle on the stove top and flipped from side-to-side, which results in a flattened shape rather than the rounded top seen in baked rolls or cake-type muffins.

Of English origin, they are called English muffins to distinguish them from the sweeter cupcake-shaped quick breads originating from the United States which are also known as muffins, although in the UK, English muffins are sometimes referred to simply as muffins or breakfast muffins. English muffins are available in a wide range of varieties, including whole wheat, multigrain, cinnamon raisin, cranberry, and apple cinnamon.

== Origin ==
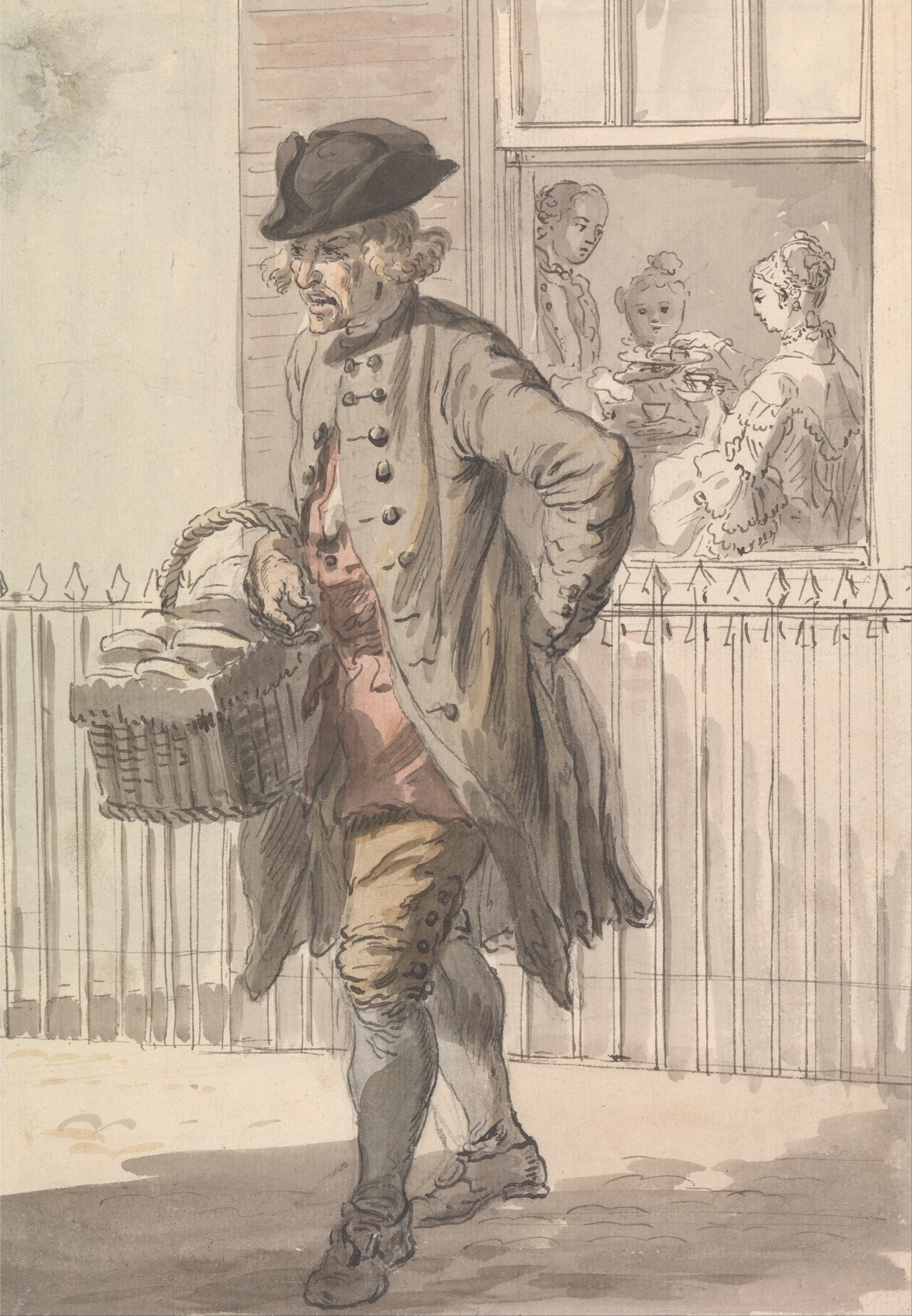
London Cries: A Muffin Man (c. 1759)

The word muffin is thought to come from the Low German muffen, meaning "little cakes". The Oxford English Dictionary also suggests a possible link to Old French moflet, a type of bread. Originally it meant "any of various kinds of bread or cake".

The first recorded use of the word muffin was in 1703, and recipes for muffins appear in British cookery books as early as 1747 in Hannah Glasse's The Art of Cookery, although the product is undoubtedly older than that. The muffins are described by Glasse as being "like a Honey-comb" inside.

In the Oxford Companion to Food, Alan Davidson states that "[t]here has always been some confusion between muffins, crumpets, and pikelets, both in recipes and in name". The English muffin has been described as a variant form of a crumpet, or a "cousin", with the difference being the location of the holes; in a crumpet, the holes go all the way to the top, whereas with an English muffin, the holes are inside.

=== Muffin men ===
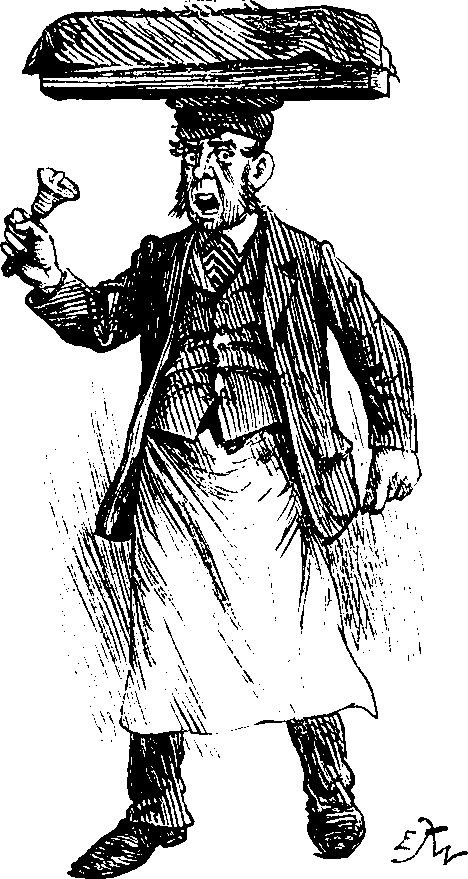
A Victorian-era muffin man ringing a bell, Punch, 1892

The increasing popularity of flatbread muffins by the mid-18th century is attested by the existence of muffin men, a type of hawker who would travel door to door selling English muffins as a snack bread before most homes had their own ovens.

The bell-ringing of muffin men became so common that by 1839 the British Parliament passed a bill to prohibit it, but this was not adhered to by sellers. In 1861, "goodsized" muffins from street-sellers were commonly sold for a halfpenny each; crumpets were about a penny.

Comparing the bell-ringing of muffin men to the melodic chimes from an approaching ice cream van that generates excitement in children today, Michael Paterson writes in A Brief History of Life in Victorian Britain, "the ringing of a handbell was one of the most joyous sounds in a Victorian childhood". The tradition of the muffin man continued until the Second World War.

== By country ==
=== United Kingdom ===
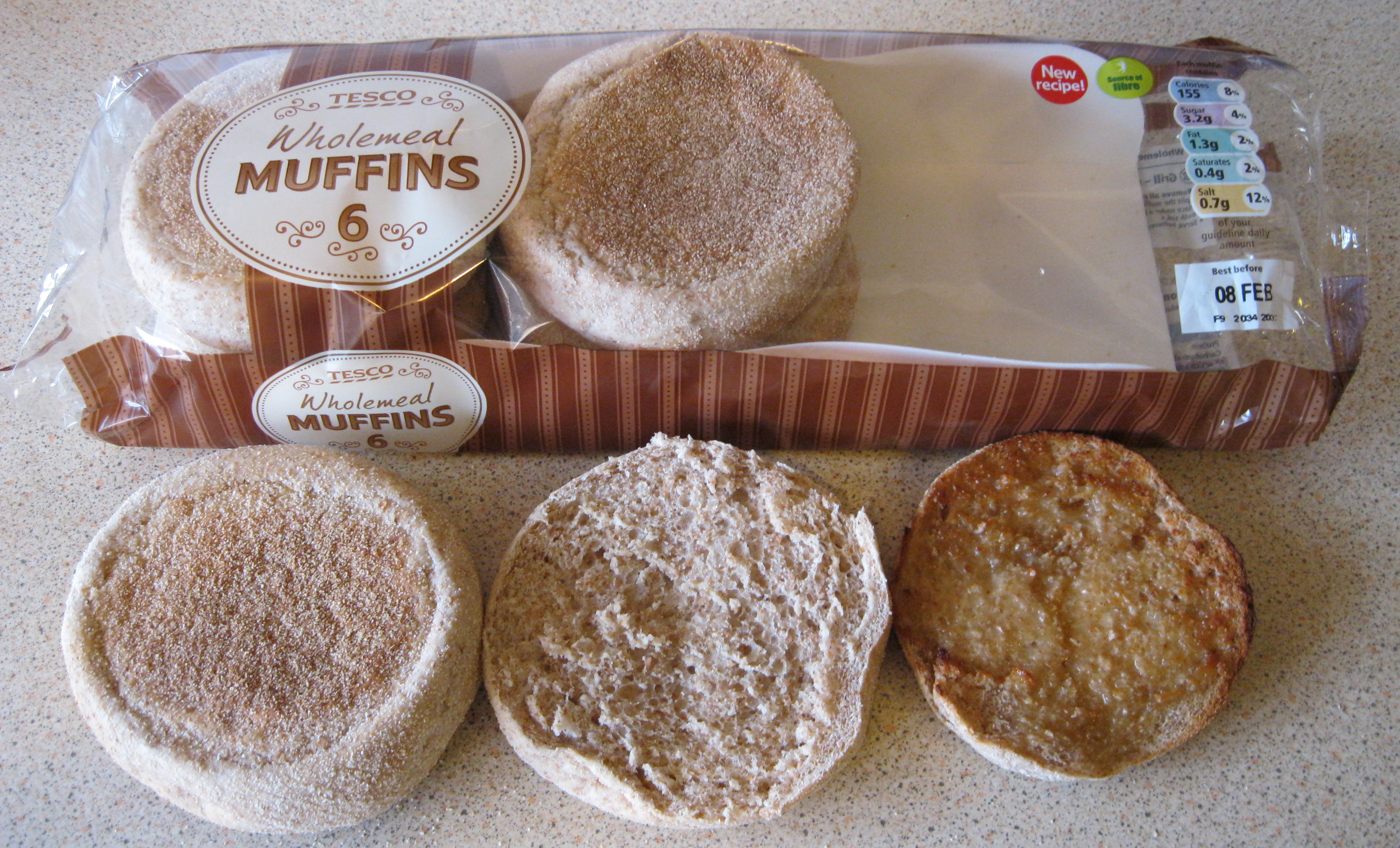
A wholemeal English muffin, whole, split, toasted and topped with butter

Both English muffins and sweet American-style cupcake-shaped muffins are referred to as muffins in the UK, although the terms English muffin, breakfast muffin, or toasting muffin are often used to indicate the former, and legislation refers to the latter as American muffins. They are usually consumed with tea or coffee, and sometimes feature in afternoon tea served in UK hotels. They are also consumed for breakfast in the form of American-style breakfast sandwiches.

=== United States ===
"Mush muffins (called slipperdowns in New England) were a Colonial [American] muffin made with hominy on a hanging griddle." These and other types of flatbread muffins were known to American settlers, but they declined in popularity with the advent of the quickbread muffin.

References to English muffins as a product distinct from crumpets appear in U.S. newspapers starting as early as 1824 in Charleston, South Carolina. Detailed descriptions of them and recipes were published as early as 1870.

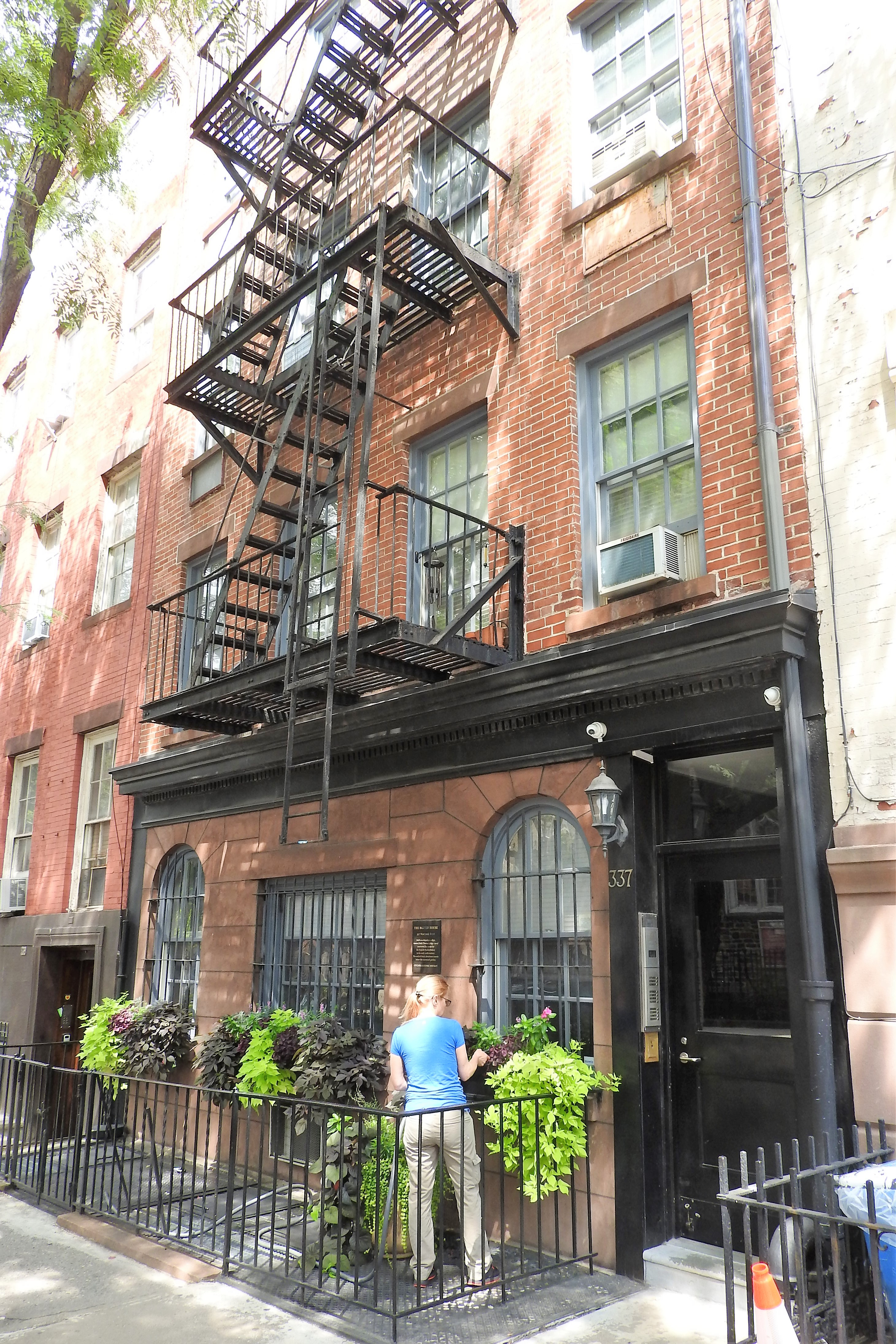
The "Muffin House" in Manhattan, home of Samuel Bath Thomas' second bakery, and ancestor of Thomas' English Muffins

A popular brand of English muffin in the U.S. is Thomas', which was founded in Manhattan, New York, by English immigrant Samuel Bath Thomas in 1880. He reintroduced the flatbread muffin to the American market. Thomas called the product "toaster crumpets", and intended them as a "more elegant alternative to toast' to be served in fine hotels. Thomas opened a second bakery around the corner from the first at 337 West 20th Street in a building that remains known as "The Muffin House". Today the company is owned by Bimbo Bakeries USA, which also owns the Entenmann's, Boboli, Stroehmann, Oroweat, and Arnold brands.

In 1910, Fred Wolferman of Kansas City, Missouri, began making denser English muffins at his family grocery, using empty tin cans as molds.

Foster's sourdough English muffins was a popular brand of English muffin originally from San Francisco. They were a signature menu item at Foster's restaurants from the 1940s to the 1970s, and continued to be produced as a packaged brand until 2008.

=== Portugal ===
English muffins are similar to the Portuguese bolo do caco.

== Preparation ==
Preparation of flatbread "English" muffins
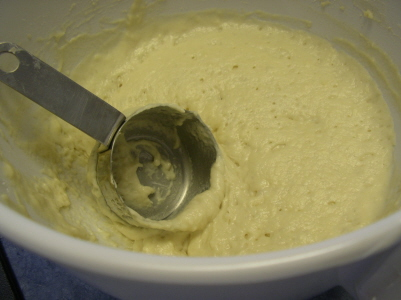
The dough is slack, or relatively wet

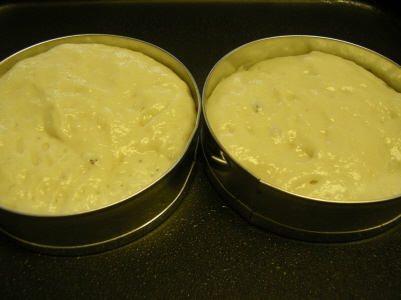
is cooked in rings

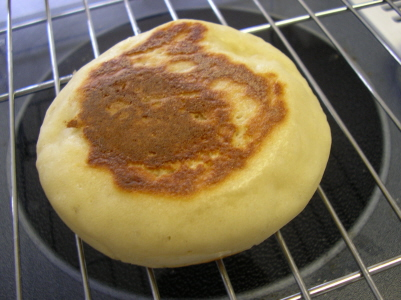
and then cooled

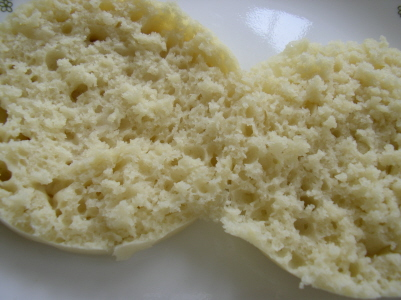
before it is split

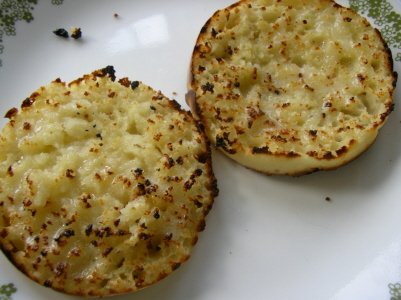
and finally toasted.

=== Bakeware ===
Muffin rings are metal cookware used for oven-baking or griddle-cooking flatbread muffins. They are circle-shaped objects made of thin metal. The rings are about one inch high.

A "muffineer" was originally a sugar shaker, looking like a large salt cellar with a perforated decorative top, for spreading powdered sugar on muffins and other sweet cakes. Later, in the 19th century, the term was also used to describe a silver, or silver-plated, muffin dish, with a domed lid and a compartment below for hot water, used to keep toasted English muffins warm before serving.

== In popular culture ==
The traditional English nursery rhyme "The Muffin Man", which dates from 1820 at the latest, traces to that custom.

A well-known reference to English muffins is in Oscar Wilde's 1895 play The Importance of Being Earnest.

== See also ==
- Scone
- List of breads
- List of British breads
