= Muffin Islands =

Coordinates: 55°52′30″N 132°17′30″W

Muffin Islands is an island in Wrangell, Alaska, in the United States. The islands lie at the entrance of Ernest Sound.

Muffin Islands has been noted for its unusual place name.
