= The Muffin Man =

Children's nursery rhyme

Sheet music for Harry King's setting of the song performed by Dan Leno (1889)

"The Muffin Man" is a traditional nursery rhyme, children's song, or children's game of English origin. It has a Roud Folk Song Index number of 7922.

== Origins and meaning ==
The rhyme was first recorded in a British manuscript circa 1820, that is preserved in the Bodleian Library with lyrics very similar to those used today:

Do you know the muffin man?
The muffin man, the muffin man.
Do you know the muffin man
Who lives in Drury Lane?

Victorian households had many of their fresh foods delivered, such as muffins, which were delivered door-to-door by a vendor known as a muffin man. The "muffins" in question are the bread item also known as English muffins, not the typically sweeter variety originating in the United States.

The rhyme and game appear to have spread to other countries in the mid-nineteenth century, particularly the United States, the Netherlands, and Singapore. As with many traditional songs, there are regional variations in wording; for example, another popular English version substitutes "Dorset Lane" for Drury Lane, while in the Dutch version (entitled Zeg ken jij de mosselman), mussels are substituted for muffins, and Scheveningen, the fishermans harbour near the Hague, for Drury Lane. In Singapore, the muffin man is replaced by the Satay man, and Drury Lane is replaced with Tiong Bahru.

In Volume 5 of his contemporary account of the London Prize Ring, Boxiana, published in 1829, Pierce Egan writes of an attempted fix (or "cross") of a match scheduled for 18 October 1825, between Reuben Marten and Jonathan Bissel ("Young Gas"). Young Gas refused to take the bribe and one week later identified the person who offered him £200 to throw the fight as a "Mr. Smith, a muffin-baker in Gray's Inn Lane". Young Gas also identified the "gentlemen" who employed the muffin-baker to act as go between, but those gentlemen denied involvement claiming they did not have "the slightest knowledge of the muffin-man".

Urban legend claims that a local baker named Frederick Thomas Lynwood who lived on Drury Lane in London lured children into a dark alley by tying baked goods such as English muffins onto a string in order to murder them. There are no historical records of Lynwood.

== Lyrics ==
The most widely known lyrics are:

The Muffin Man
The Muffin Man, performed by Sinclair Ukiri (2025)

Do [or "Oh, do"] you know the muffin man,
The muffin man, the muffin man.
Do you know the muffin man,
Who lives on Drury Lane?

Yes [or "Oh, yes"], I know the muffin man,
The muffin man, the muffin man,
Yes, I know the muffin man,
Who lives on Drury Lane.

It then repeats on and on.

== Game ==
Iona and Peter Opie observed that, although the rhyme had remained fairly consistent, the game associated with it has changed at least three times including: as a forfeit game, a guessing game, and a dancing ring.

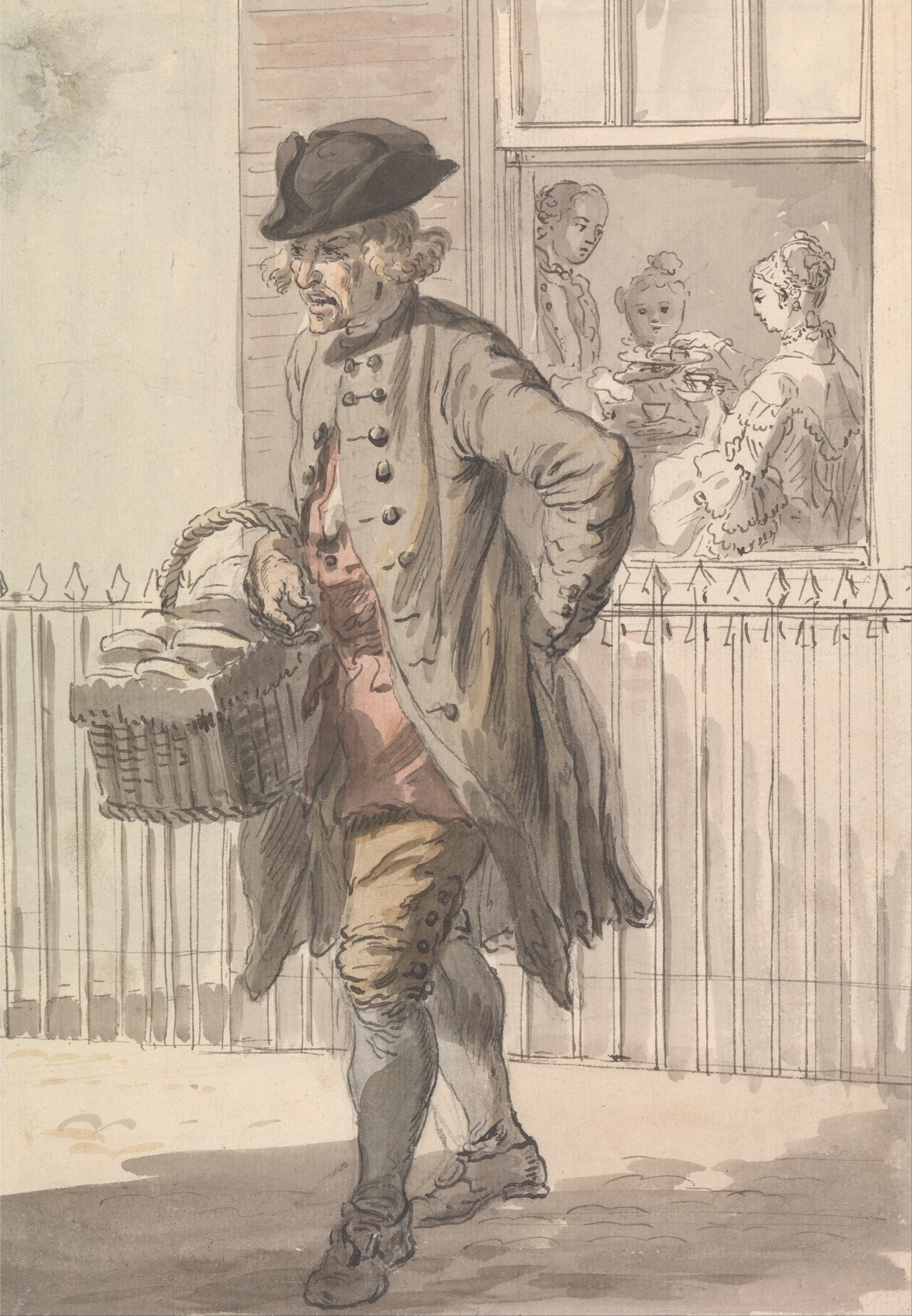
London Cries: A Muffin Man by Paul Sandby (c. 1759)

In The Young Lady's Book (1888), Matilda Anne Mackarness described the game as:

The first player turns to the one next her, [sic] and to some sing-song tune exclaims:

"Do you know the muffin man? The muffin man, the muffin man.
Do you know the muffin man who lives in Drury Lane?"

The person addressed replies to the same tune:

"Yes, I know the muffin man. The muffin man, the muffin man.
Oh, yes, I know the muffin man, who lives in Drury Lane."

Upon this they both exclaim:

"Then two of us know the muffin man, the muffin man,".

No. 2 then turns to No. 3, repeating the same words, who replies in the same way, only saying, "Three of us know the muffin man,". No. 3 then turns to No. 4, and so on round the room, the same question and answer being repeated, the chorus only varied by the addition of one more number each time.

Verses beyond those described in the book have been sung. For example, the song may be concluded, "We all know the Muffin Man ..."
