= Muffin =

Quickbread in individual servings

Quickbread muffin
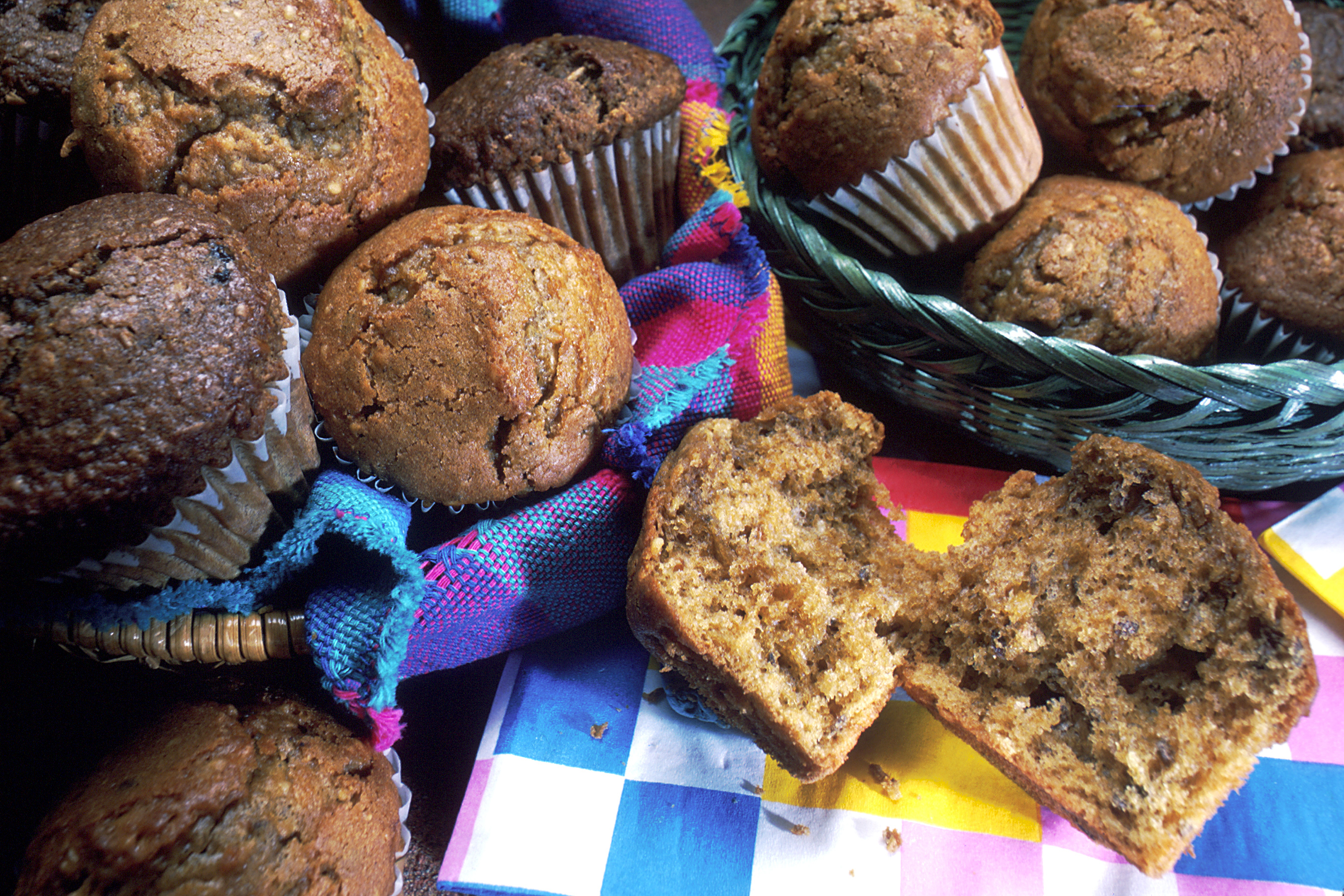
- Alternative names: American muffin
- Type: Quick bread
- Course: Traditionally breakfast
- Place of origin: United States
- Main ingredients: Flour, eggs, leavening, vegetable oil, sugar
- Ingredients generally used: Blueberries, chocolate, poppyseeds, or bran

A muffin is a type of individual-sized baked good. It is often a small, sweet quickbread or cake in a cup-shaped container. It may be named for additional ingredients, e.g., the blueberry muffin contains blueberries.

While muffins are often sweetened, there are also savory varieties made with ingredients such as cornbread muffins and cheese muffins, and less sweet varieties such as traditional bran muffins. The quickbread muffin originated in North America during the 19th century.

== History ==
Recipes for quickbread muffins are common in 19th-century American cookbooks. Recipes for yeast-based muffins, which were sometimes called common muffins or wheat muffins in 19th-century American cookbooks, can be found in much older cookbooks. In Fannie Farmer's Boston Cooking-School Cook Book, she gave recipes for both quick bread muffins and English muffins.

== Flavors ==
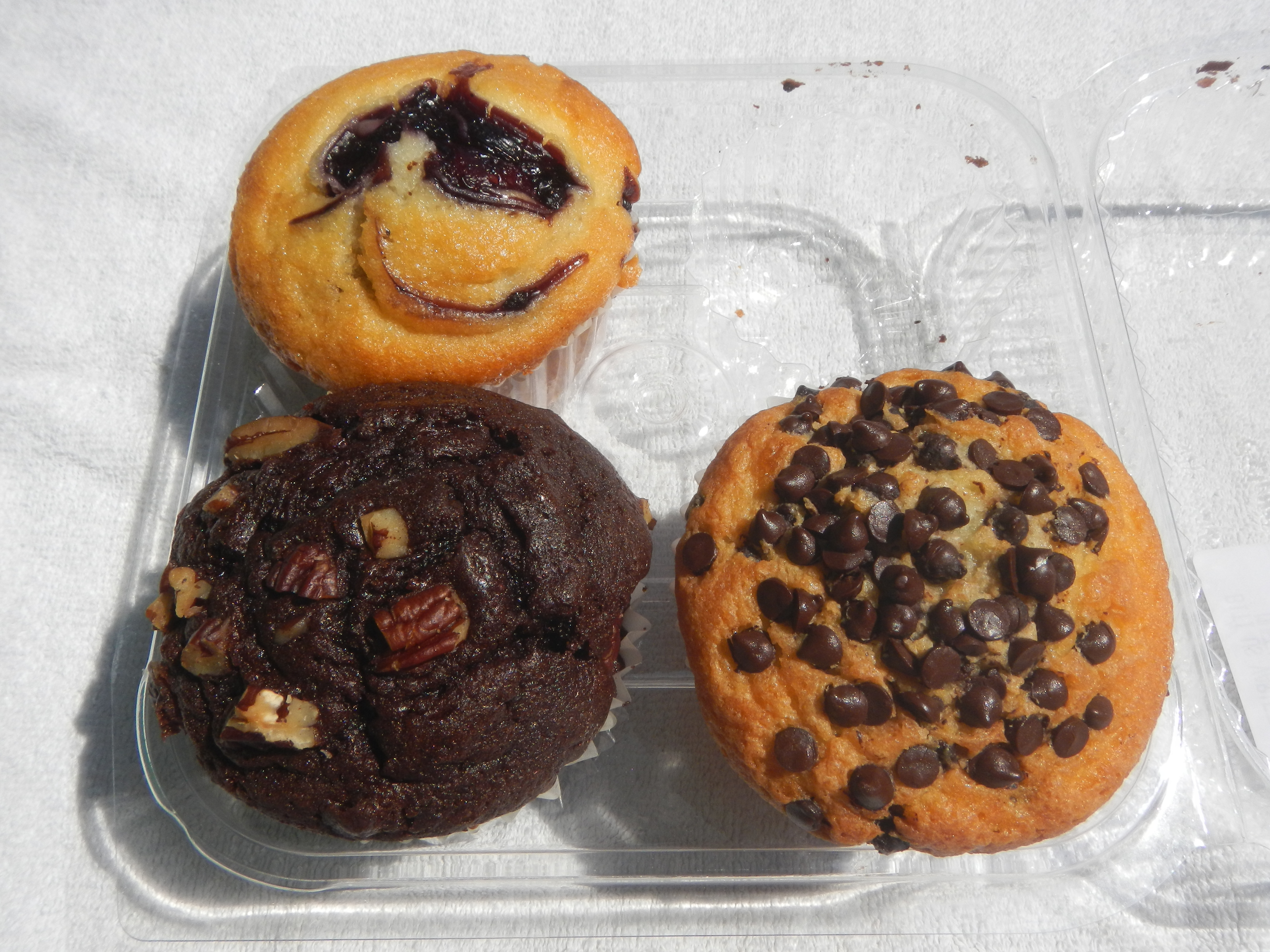
Three flavors of muffin: blueberry, chocolate, and chocolate chip

Quickbread muffins (sometimes described in Britain as "American muffins") are baked, individual-sized, cupcake-shaped foods with a "moist, coarse-grained" texture. Muffins are available in both savoury varieties, such as cornmeal and cheese muffins, or sweet varieties such as blueberry, chocolate chip, lemon or banana flavours. Muffins may have solid items mixed into the batter, such as berries, chocolate chips or nuts.

Sweetened muffins range from lightly sweetened muffins to products that are "richer than many cakes in fat and sugar." They are similar to cupcakes in size and cooking methods, with the main difference being that cupcakes are intended to be sweet desserts and are often topped with icing.

Muffin flavors

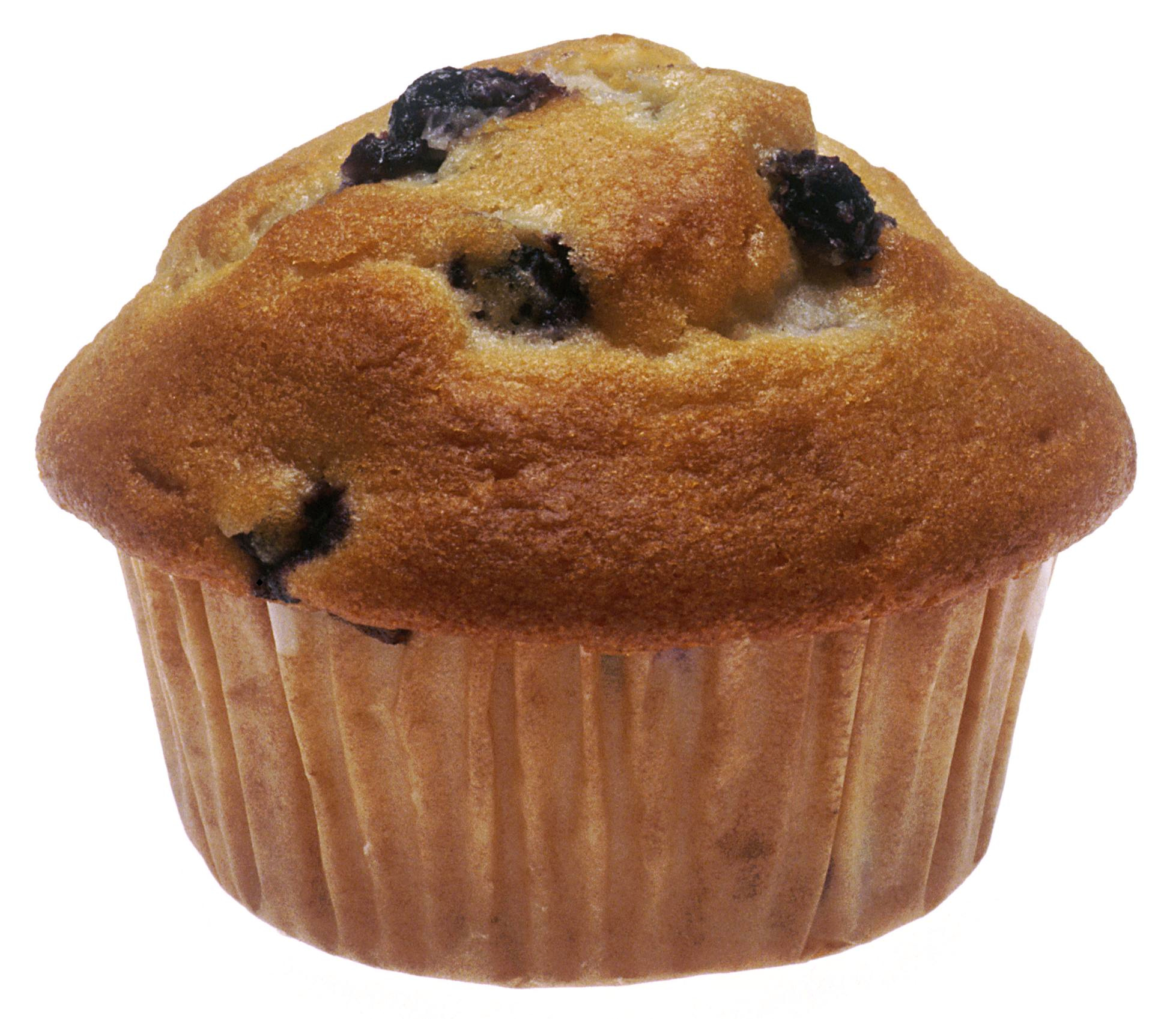
Blueberry muffin, a common flavor

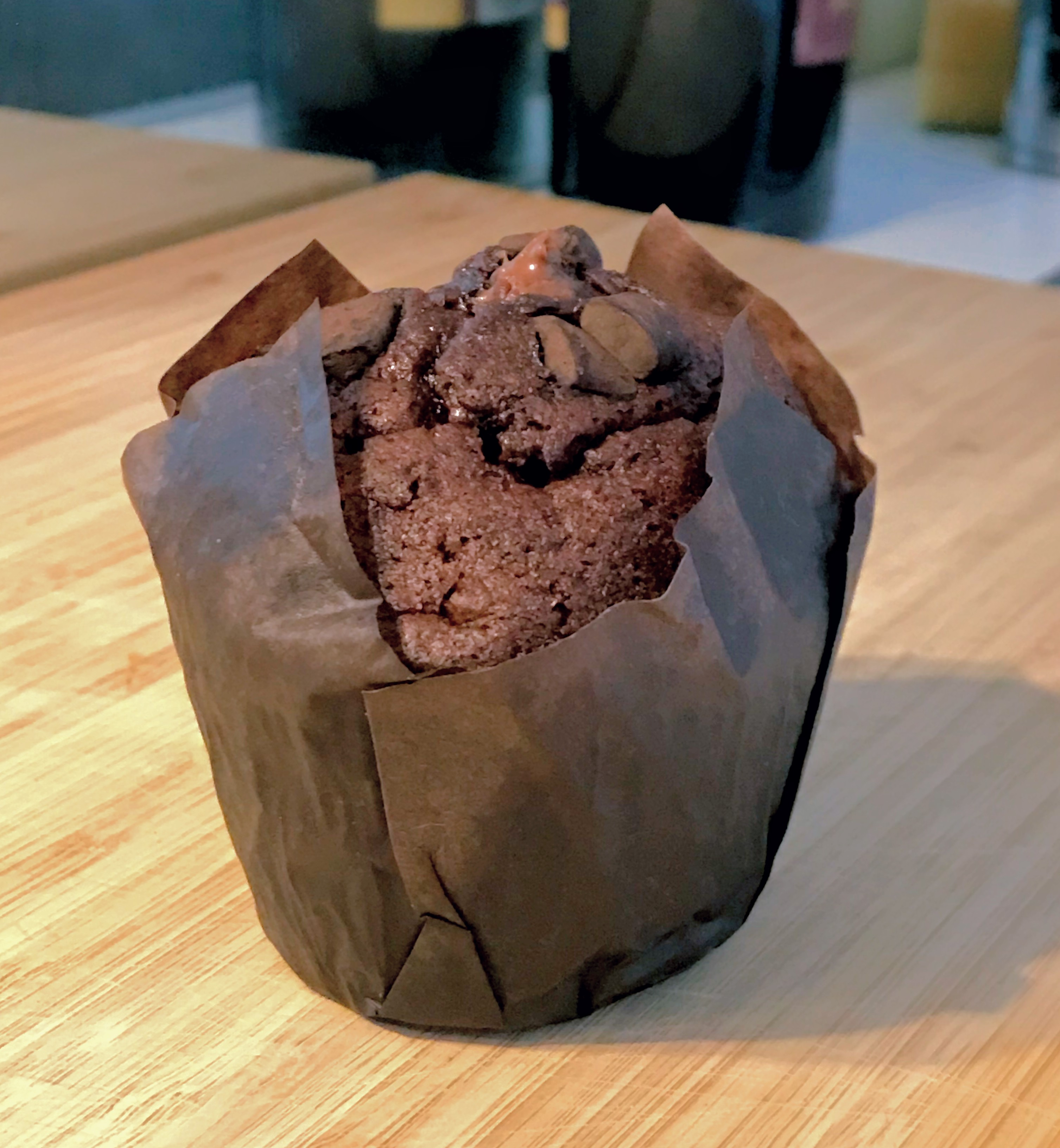
A chocolate muffin

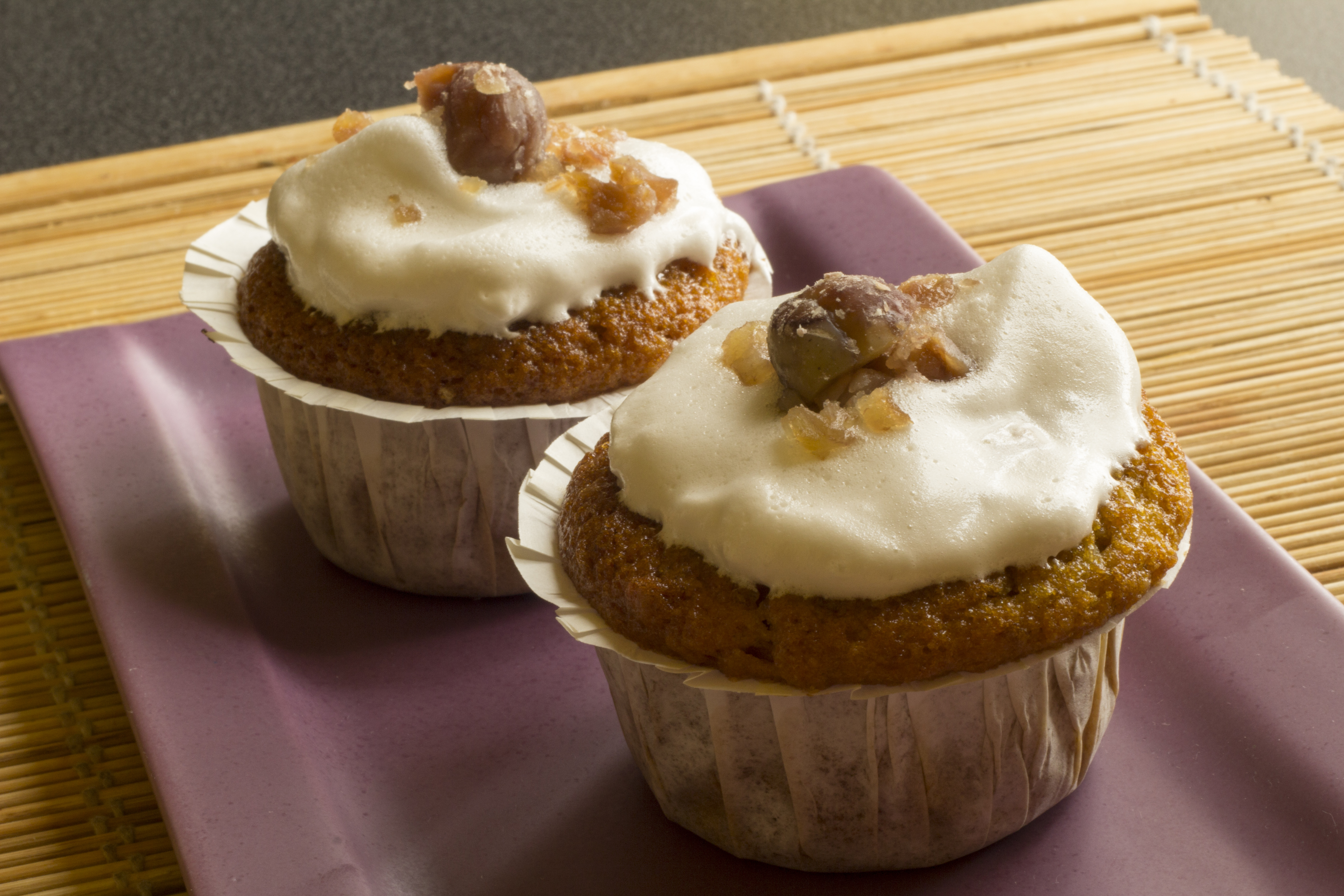
Pumpkin muffins in muffin cups

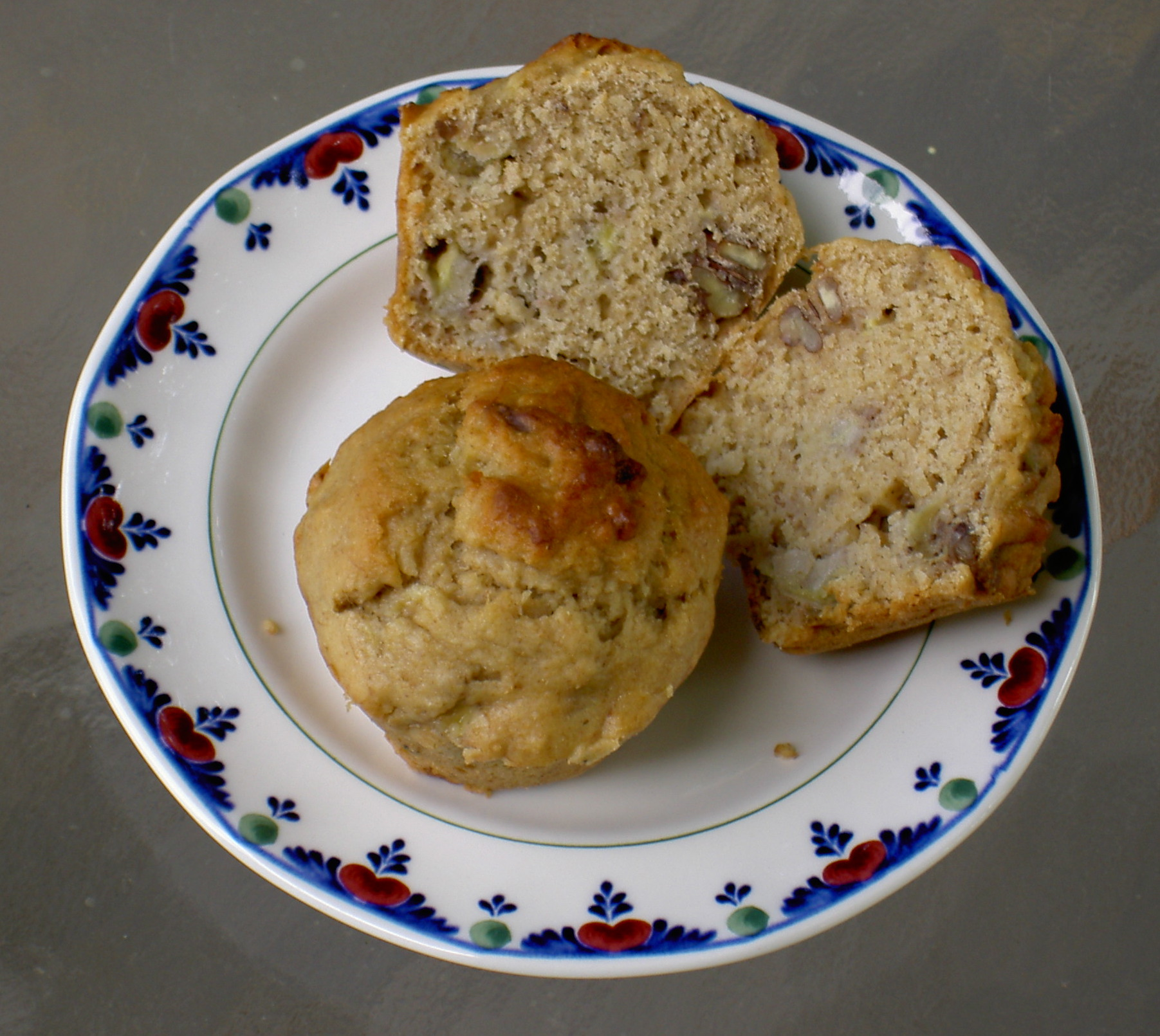
Banana nut muffin

Morning glory muffin

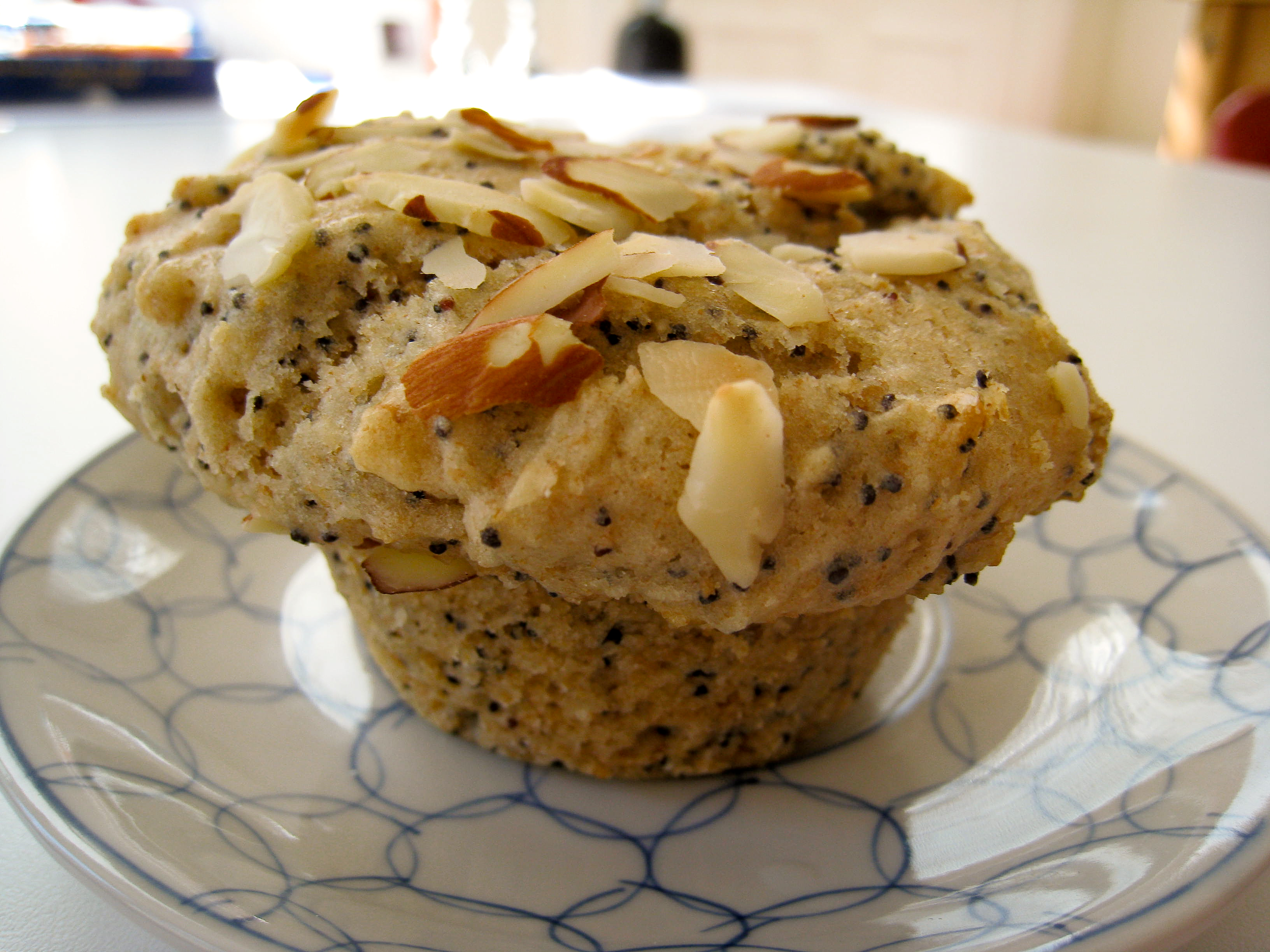
A vegan lemon poppyseed muffin

Cornbread muffins

Savory cheese muffins

Zucchini muffins

=== Bran muffins ===
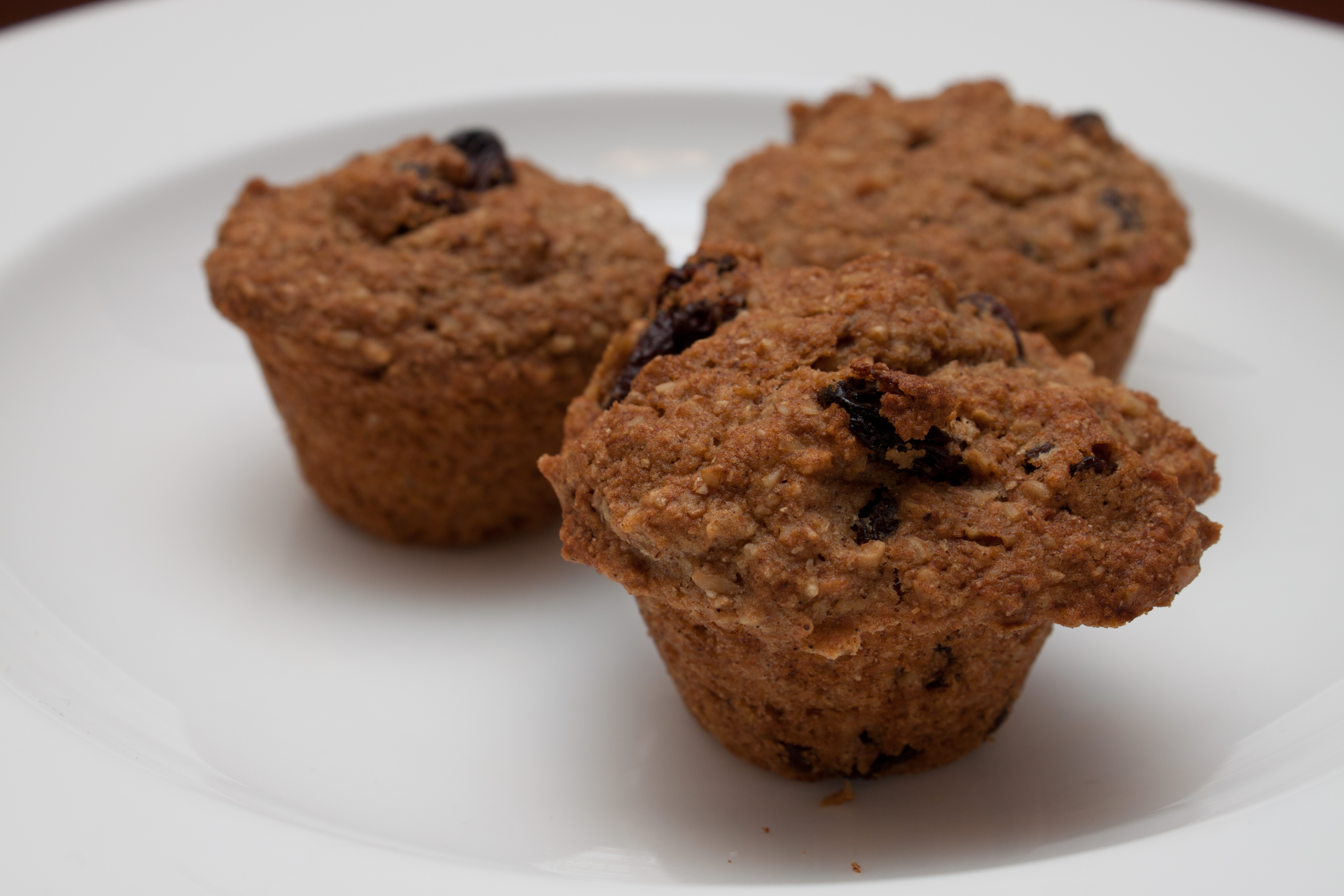
Oat bran muffins

Bran muffins use less flour and use bran instead, as well as using molasses and brown sugar. The mix is turned into a pocketed muffin tray, or into individual paper moulds, and baked in an oven. Milk is often added, as it contributes to the appealing browning appearance. The result are raised, individual quickbreads. The muffin may have toppings added, such as cinnamon sugar, streusel, nuts, or chocolate chips.

=== Poppyseed muffins ===
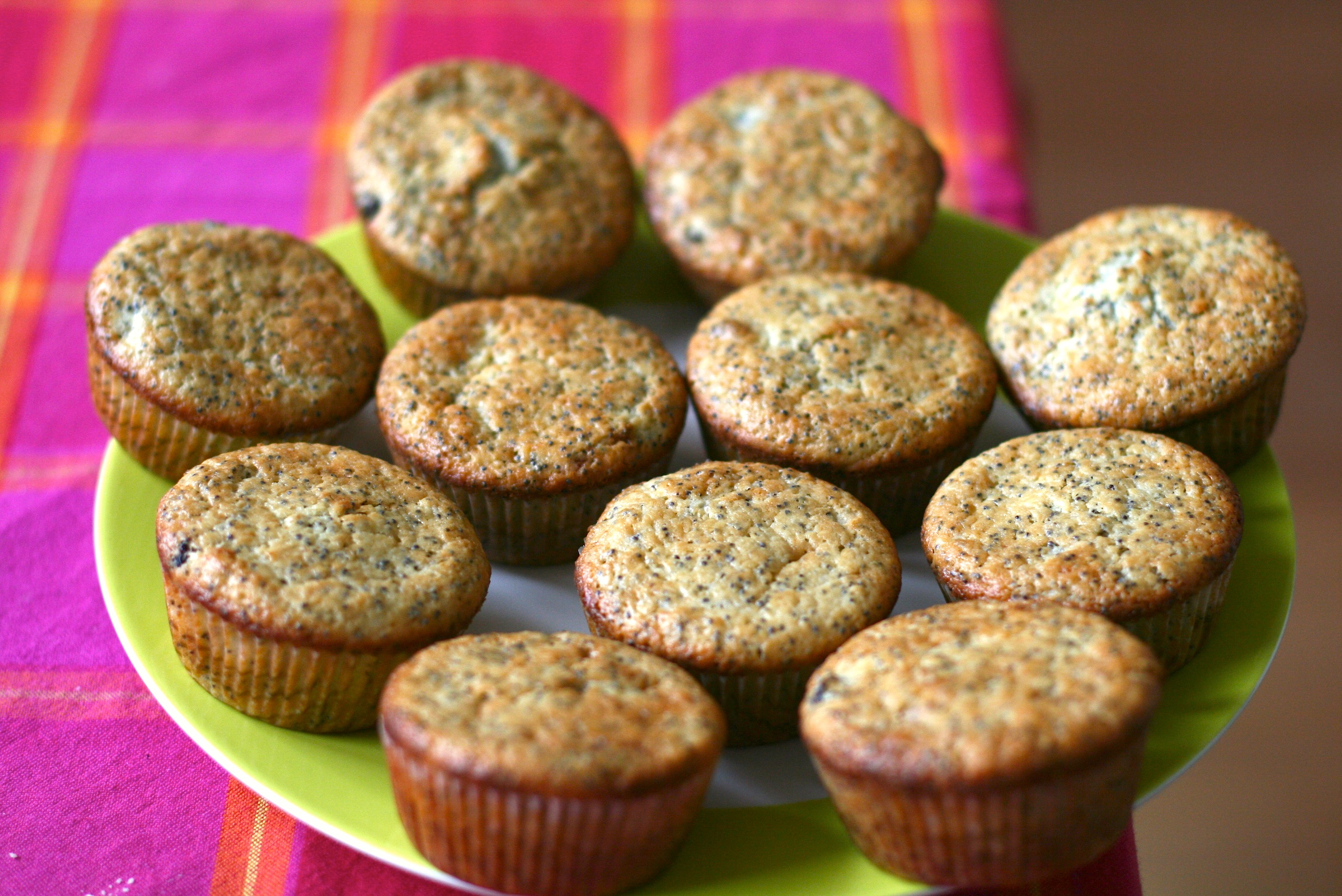
Poppyseed muffins on a plate

Poppyseed muffins (or poppy seed muffins) contain poppy seeds. Poppy seeds were already popular in most parts of the world for their taste and texture—as well as the narcotic characteristics of the opium poppy plant they are harvested from. In modern times, growing poppy seeds is a difficult business for American farmers, due to the risk of heroin—which is derived from poppies—being produced. Other countries have fewer difficulties with permitting the growth of poppies for the seeds alone, which have very low (but not zero) levels of opium alkaloids, such as morphine. As other countries began imitating the American muffin, the occasional use of poppy seeds to flavor them spread as well. Although poppy seeds cannot be used as a narcotic due to very low levels of opium alkaloids, they do have enough that drug tests often report false positives after a drug-free person eats a few poppyseed muffins. In one reported case the UAE jailed a man for four years after poppy seeds from a roll he had eaten at an airport were found on his clothes.

Lemon is commonly paired with poppyseeds in muffin-making.

== Muffin tops ==
The muffin top is the crisp upper part of the muffin, which has developed a "browned crust that's slightly singed around the edges". They were the focus of a 1997 Seinfeld sitcom episode, "The Muffin Tops" (episode 21 of season 8), where the character Elaine, who only eats the tops when she buys a muffin, realizes that a bakery selling just the tops could be successful. Once the business is running, she has to figure out what to do with the muffin bottoms, which proves difficult.

In 2018, McDonald's restaurant announced they were planning to sell muffin tops as part of their McCafe breakfast menu.

== Bakeware and baking aids ==
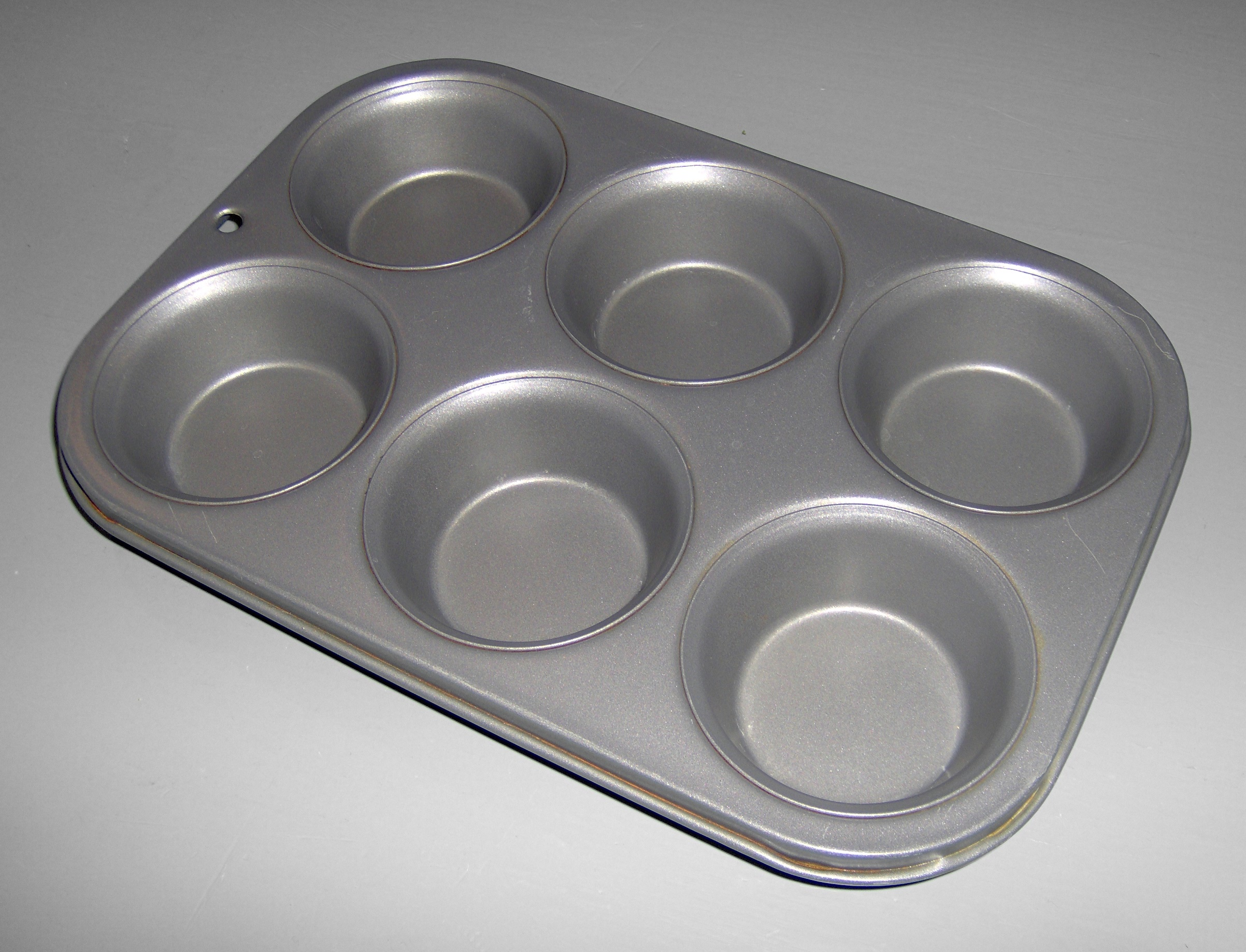
A typical muffin pan

Muffin tins and muffin pans are typically metal bakeware which has round bowl-shaped depressions into which muffin batter is poured. Muffin tins or pans can be greased with butter or cooking spray, to lessen the issue of batter sticking to the pan. Alternatively, muffin cups or cases are used. Cups or cases are usually round sheets of foil, or silicone with scallop-pressed edges, giving the muffin a round cup shape. They are used in the baking of muffins to line the bottoms of muffin tins, to facilitate the easy removal of the finished muffin from the tin. The advantage to cooks is easier removal and cleanup, more precise form, and moister muffins; however, using them will prevent a crust from forming on the sides and bottom.

Paper liners may be used.

A variety of sizes for muffin cases are available. Slightly different sizes are considered "standard" in different countries. Miniature cases are commonly 1 to 1.25 in (25 to 32 mm) in diameter at the base and .75 in (19 mm) tall. Standard-size cases range from 1.75 to 2 inches (44 to 51 mm) in diameter at the base and are 1.25 to 1.5 in (32 to 38 mm) tall. Some jumbo-size cases can hold more than twice the capacity of standard cases. Australian and Swedish bakers are accustomed to taller paper cases with a larger diameter at the top than American and British bakers.

== Nutrition ==
Over the years, the size and calorie content of muffins has changed to be more similar to a large cupcake: the "3-inch muffins grandmother made had only 120 to 160 calories. But today's giant bakery muffins contain from 340 to 630 calories each."

Harvard University's Nutrition Source states that while many fruit muffins may seem "...to be a better breakfast than their donut neighbors" at your local coffeeshop, with their "...often refined flours, high sodium, and plenty of added sugar...and large portion size, they're far from the optimal food choice to start your day." Consumers think that commercial muffins are a healthier choice than donuts; however, according to Registered Dietician Karen Collins, yeast or raised donuts have from 170 to 270 calories each (cake doughnuts have from 290 to 360 calories), while large bakery muffins have from 340 to 630 calories each and 11 to 27 grams of total fat. "Most muffins are deceptively high in fats", with up to 40% fat content, which many consumers are not aware of.

The flavor of muffin can have a big impact on its fat and sugar content; one major fast food chain's low-fat berry muffin has 300 calories, whereas the same restaurant's chocolate chunk muffin has 620 calories. Harvard's Nutrition Source recommends smaller-sized, whole-grain muffins with reduced sugar content, liquid plant oil instead of shortening or butter, and added wholesome foods such as nuts (or nut flour), beans (or bean flour), or fresh fruit or vegetables.

== Manufacture ==
Fresh baked muffins are sold by bakeries, donut shops and some fast food restaurants and coffeehouses. Factory-baked muffins are sold at grocery stores and convenience stores, and are served in some coffee shops and cafeterias.

Muffins are made with flour, sieved together with bicarbonate of soda as a raising agent. To this is added butter or shortening, eggs and any flavourings (fruit, such as blueberries, chocolate or banana; or savouries, such as cheese).

Commercial muffins may have "modified starches", corn syrup (or high-fructose corn syrup), xanthan gum, or guar gum to increase moisture content and lengthen shelf life (these gums can also make added solids, such as chocolate chips, disperse more evenly in the batter).

== Etymology ==
One 19th-century source suggests that muffin may be related to the Greek bread maphula, a 'cake baked on a hearth or griddle', or from Old French mou-pain 'soft bread', which may have been altered into mouffin. The word is first found in print in 1703, spelled moofin; it is of uncertain origin but possibly derived from the Low German Muffen, the plural of Muffe, meaning 'small cake', or possibly with some connection to the Old French moufflet meaning 'soft', as said of bread. The expression muffin-man, meaning a street seller of muffins, is attested in a 1754 poem, which includes the line: "Hark! the shrill Muffin-Man his Carol plies."

== As symbols ==
American muffins appear as state symbols in three US states:

- The corn muffin is the official state muffin of Massachusetts.
- The blueberry muffin is the official state muffin of Minnesota.
- The apple muffin is the official state muffin of New York.

== See also ==
- American cuisine
- Breakfast foods
- Croissant
- Cruffin
- Crumpet
- Cupcake
- Dessert
- Donut
- Jiffy mix
- List of baked goods
- Mantecada
- The Muffin Man
- Scone
- English muffin
