= Muffin Butte =

Summit in Utah, US

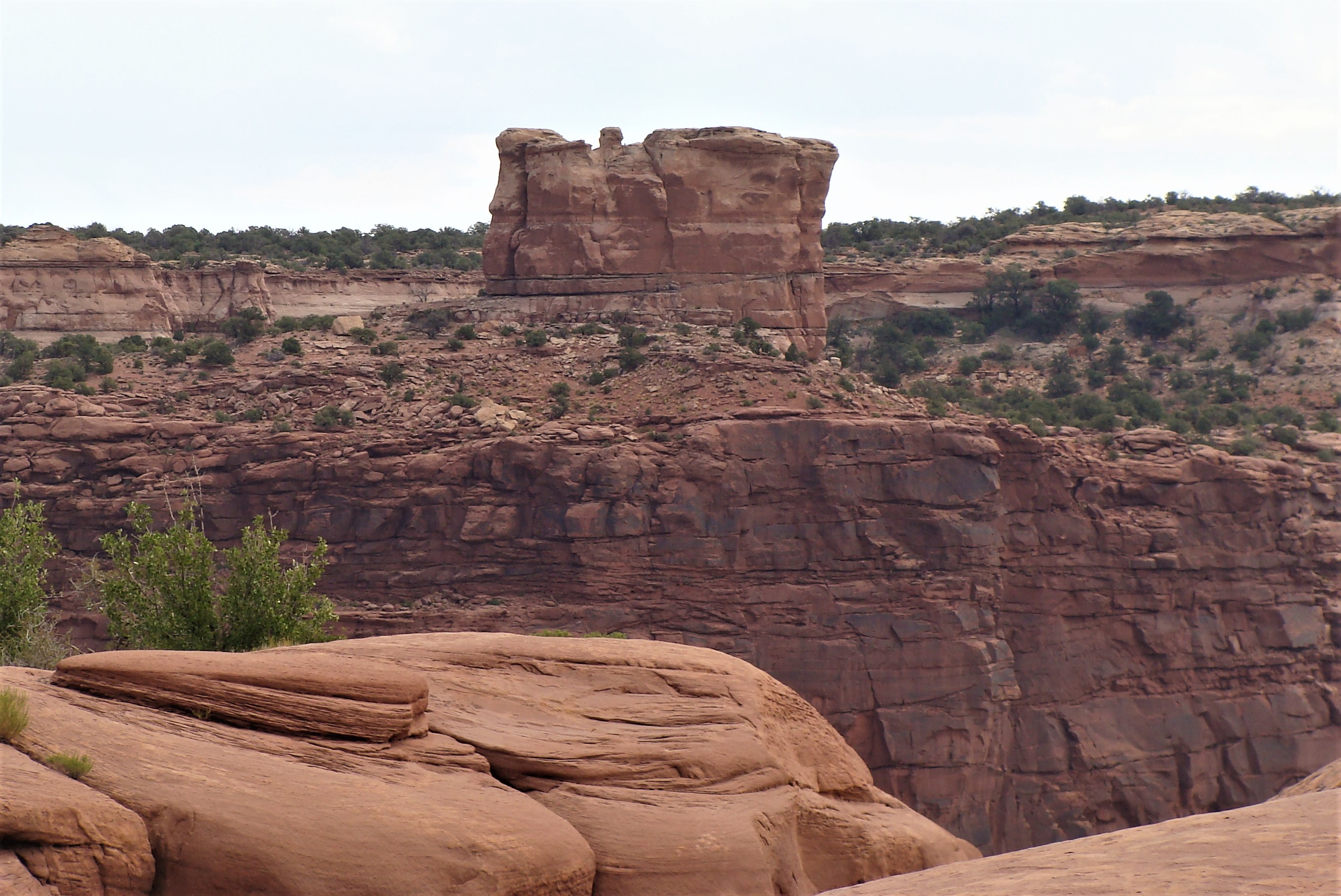
- Muffin Butte (center of photo rising above the distant skyline)

Highest point
- Elevation: 6,155 ft (1,876 m) NGVD 29
- Prominence: 135 ft (41 m)
- Coordinates: 38°22′38″N 109°52′28″W

Geography
- Location within Utah
- Location: San Juan County, Utah, U.S.
- Topo map: USGS Musselman Arch

Muffin Butte is a summit in San Juan County, Utah, in the United States. The butte with an elevation of 6,155 feet (1,876 m), is located in the Island in the Sky district of Canyonlands National Park and affords views of Soda Springs Basin and the Green River.

Muffin Butte has been noted for its unusual place name.
