= Parting lineation =

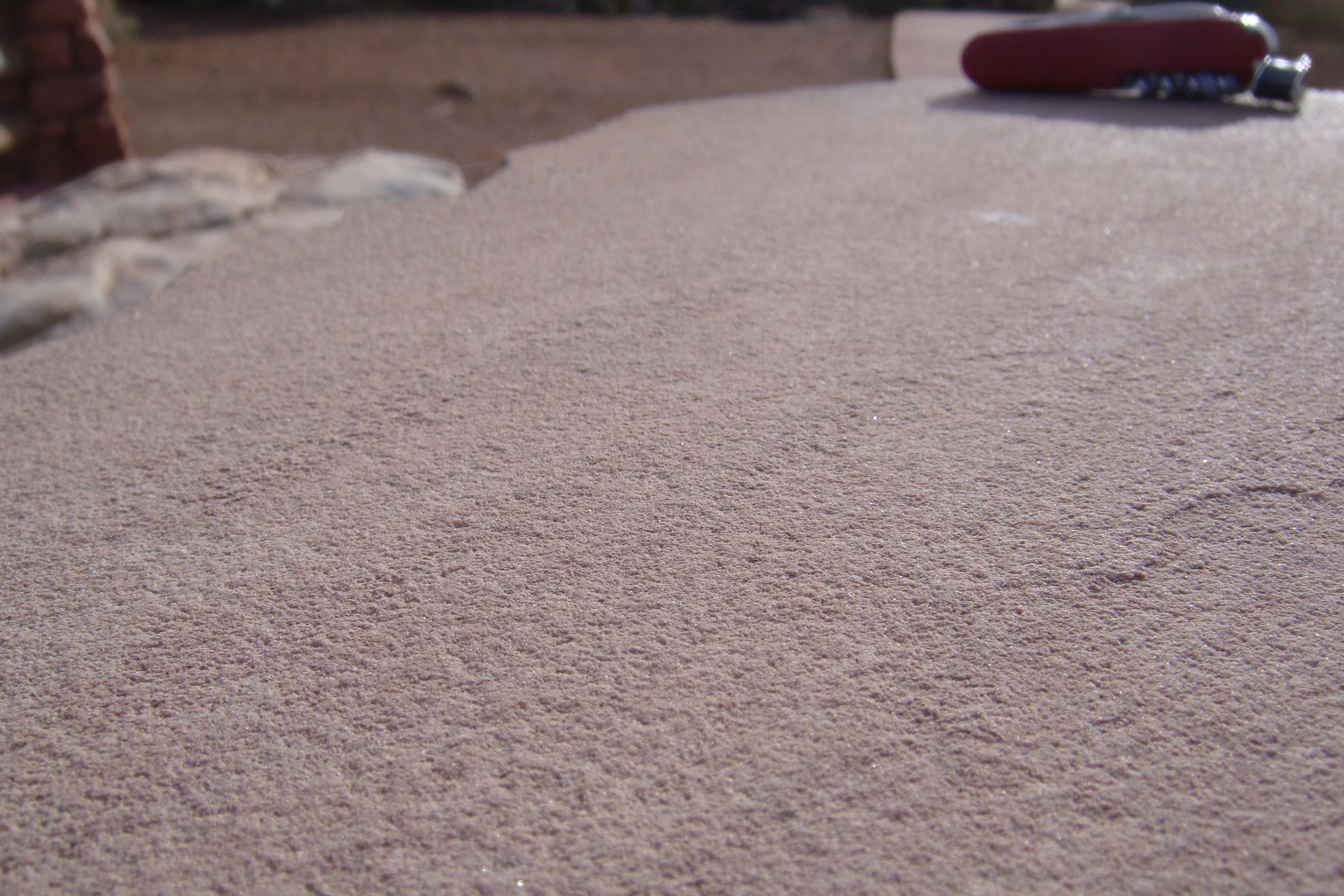
Parting lineation, from lower left to upper right; Kayenta Formation, Canyonlands National Park

Parting lineation (also known as current lineation or primary current lineation) is a subtle sedimentary structure in which sand grains are aligned in parallel lines or grooves on the surface of a body of sand (or lithified as a sandstone). The orientation of the lineation is used as a paleocurrent indicator, although the precise flow direction (i.e. upstream vs. downstream) is often indeterminable. They are also the primary indicator of the lower part of the upper flow regime bedform.

== Description ==
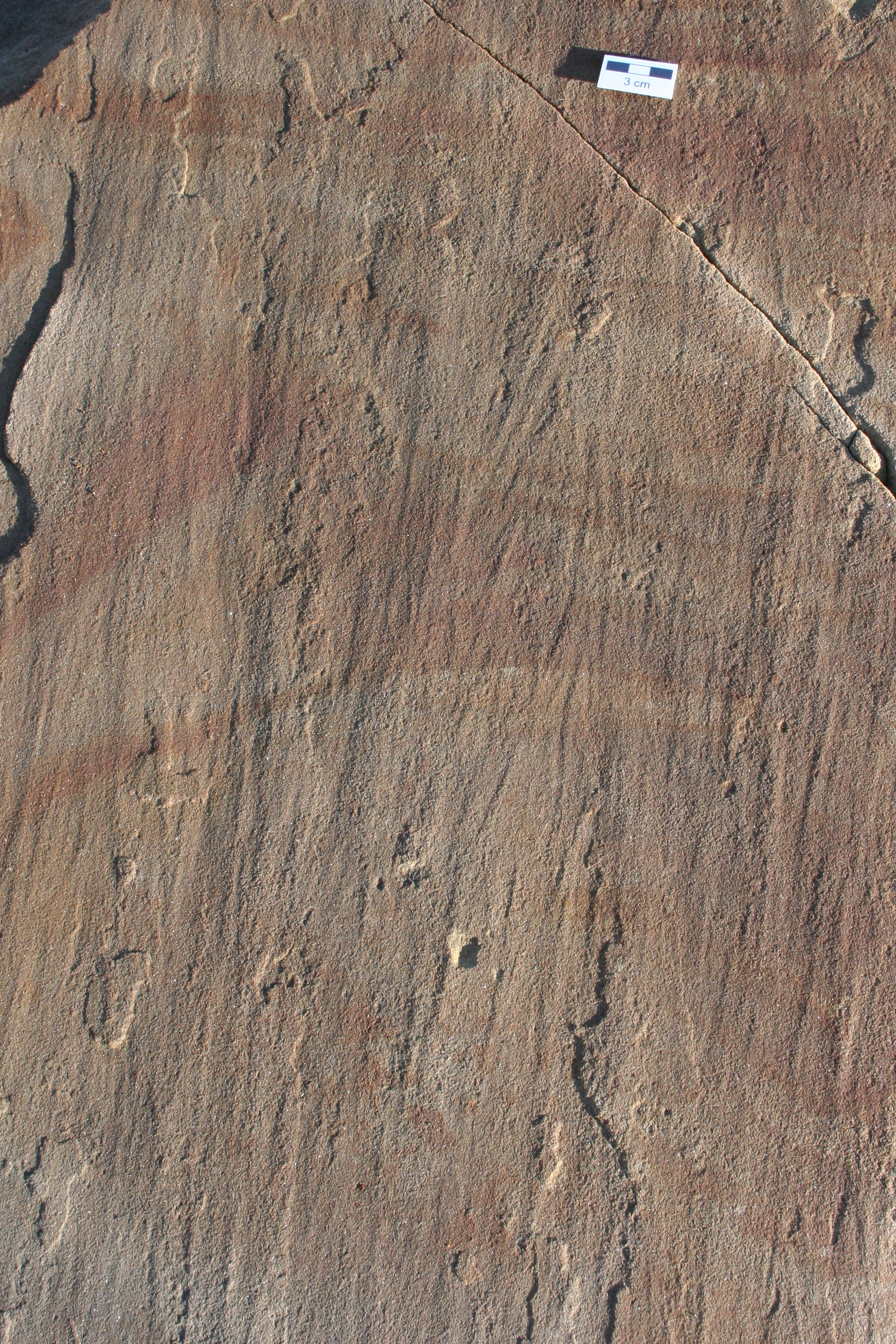
Current lineation in the Inverness Formation (Pennsylvanian), Cape Breton Island, Nova Scotia

Parting lineation is a sedimentary structure commonly found on the surface of parallel-laminated sandstones. It is aligned with the current direction, the alignment holding out in places over several square meters. The lineation is formed by flat, parallel ridges which are separated by depressions or grooves. The height of the ridges rarely exceeds several grain diameters. In profile the depressions are flat-bottomed and the ridges are rounded. Ridges and depressions are arranged en echelon, so that in downstream direction the ridges pass into depressions and vice versa. The crosswise distance between individual ridges typically varies between 0.59 and 1.25 centimeters. Length as well as spacing of the ridges augments with increasing grain size: in fine-grained sands the ridges are 3.5 to 12 centimeters long, whereas in medium-grained sands they can reach 30 centimeters in length. The long dimension of the ridges is therefore 5 to 20 times their crosswise spacing. The coarse(r) sediment fraction accumulates in the ridges, whereas dark heavy minerals and mica trails take up an intermediate position between the ridges and the grooves.

== Fabric ==
Statistical studies of the spatial arrangement of the sand grains (fabric) show that in the horizontal plane the long axes of the grains form two symmetrical maxima oriented at an angle of 10 to 20 ° to the current direction. In the vertical plane these maxima are inclined at an angle of 8 to 10 ° into the current direction and the sand grains are imbricated.

== Genesis of the structure ==
It is meanwhile widely accepted that parting lineation forms in the turbulent, viscous boundary layer immediately above the sediment-water interface. Responsible for the shaping of the structures are streaky vortex trains within the boundary layer. Downcurrent these streaks start to gradually lift off from the sediment surface until they eventually “burst”. Whenever this happens fluid rushes in from both sides. This cyclic process of lift-off, bursting and inrush of fluid exerts a shear stress on the sediment surface, which ultimately finds its expression in the spatial arrangement of the sediment grains. After all it is this lateral inrush of fluid, which “sweeps up” the grains in the grooves and redeposits them in long parallel ridges underneath the lifting turbulences. This rhythmical process is known as burst and sweep.

== Mode of occurrence ==
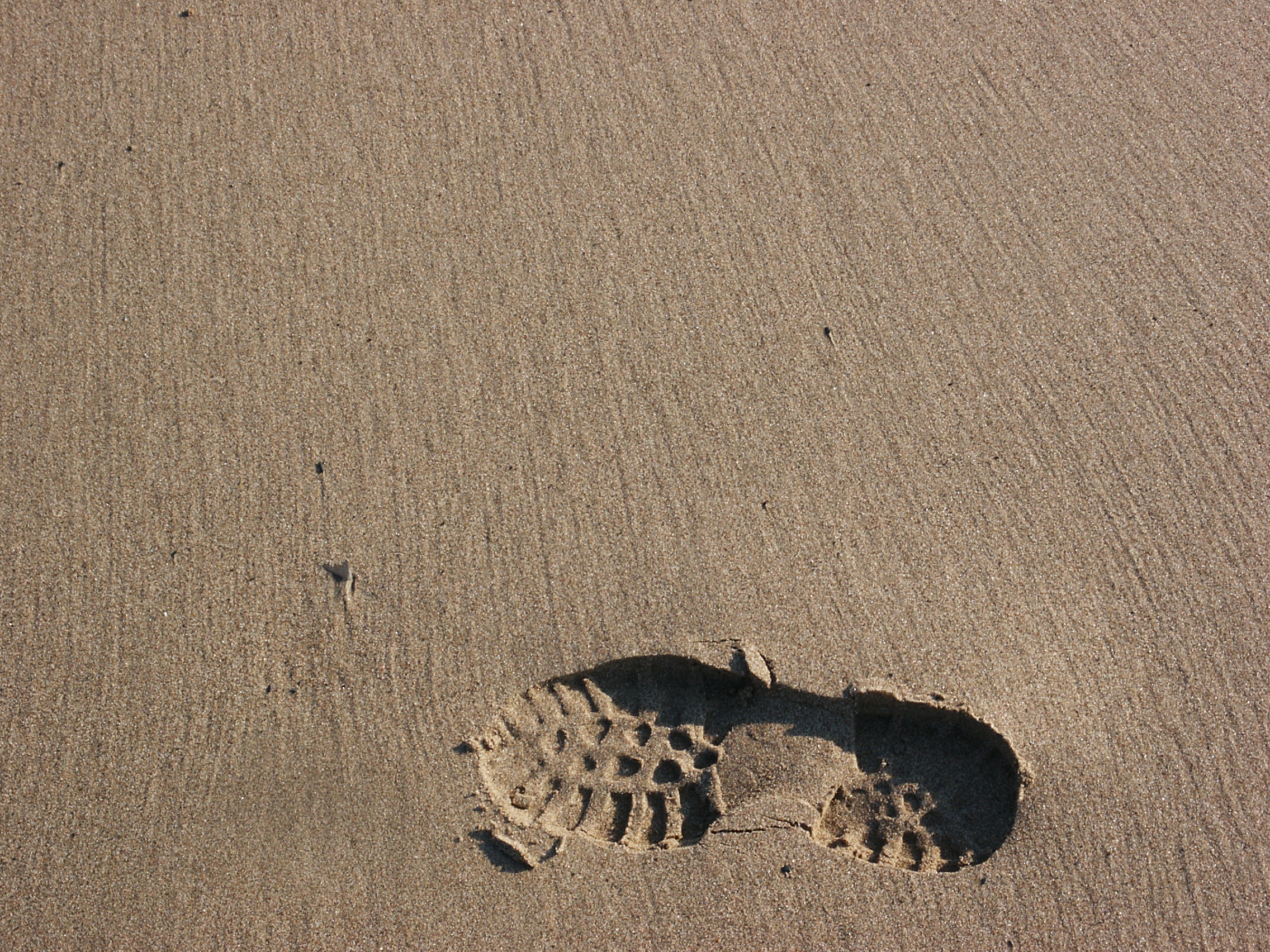
Modern current lineation in beach sand

Parting lineation is restricted to coarse silts as well as to fine- and medium-grained sands (i. e. to grain sizes of 16 to 500 μm). The structure very rarely occurs in coarser sediments. Hydraulically it is characteristic for the lower part of the upper plane bed regime and results from fairly high current velocities of 0.6 to 1.3 meters per second.

Parting lineation forms in very different depositional environments. The structure is most commonly found on the beach where it forms in flat, wet sediments due to swash. Parting lineation can also be created in dewatering tidal channels. Geological formations like for instance the Old Red Sandstone or the Buntsandstein also give proof of the shallow marine character. Parting lineation has even been described from turbidites. Yet the structure is not only restricted to the marine environment, it can also form in river sediments, especially on point bars.

Parting-step lineation, which is characterized by step-like parting surfaces, has been reported by Banerjee from varves deposited in glacial lakes.

Parting lineation was even artificially reproduced in hydraulic experiments.

Remark: in the marine environment parting lineation doesn't have to be associated solely with the upper plane bed regime, it has been reported for instance from the erosive stoss side of ripple marks, megaripples and dunes. This implies that the structure can form already under lower current velocities.

Due to its varied and rather widespread occurrence parting lineation is not a unanimous indicator for depositional environments.

== Theoretical considerations ==
In order to derive an expression for the crosswise spacing of parting lineation it is useful to start with the quadratic stress law:

τ = 1/8*f*ρ*Um2

The shear stress τ exerted by the current within the boundary layer is proportional to the square of the current velocity U. The Darcy-Weisbach friction coefficient f and the density of the fluid ρ are constants.

Empirical studies have found a dimensionless value Z = 100 for the parallel streaks/ridges. This can be equated to:

Z = 100 = ρ/η*Ut*λ

where λ represents the measured spacing, U_{t} the shearing velocity and η the viscosity of the fluid.

We also have the following equality:

U_{t} = (τ/ρ)^{1/2} which yields after solving for τ:

τ = U_{t}^{2}*ρ

After equating the two expressions for τ and some rearrangements one arrives at an expression for the crosswise spacing λ:

λ = 100*(η/ρ)*(8/U_{m}^{2}*f)^{1/2}

By inserting the following realistic values one finds for λ:

η = 1.06*10^{−3} [Pa*s]

ρ = 1000 [kg/m^{3}]

f = 0.01

U_{m} = 1 [m/s]

λ = 100*1.06*10^{−6}*(800)^{1/2} = 1.06*10^{−4}*28.28

λ = 2.998*10−3 [m]

The calculated crosswise spacing λ is 3 millimeters. This value is in fairly close agreement with the experimental values measured by Allen, which are nevertheless generally 2 to 4 times higher. The discrepancy can be explained by assuming that only strongly developed streaks leave a discernible ridge.

== Conclusions ==
Parting lineation is a very good indicator of the reigning current direction (and therefore also a good paleocurrent indicator). An analysis of the grain fabric furthermore leads to the determination the younging direction within the sedimentary succession. The lower part of the upper plane bed hydraulic regime of relatively swift currents is characterized by parting lineation.
