= Transverse aeolian ridges =

Transverse aeolian ridges (TARs) are visually bright features commonly found in topographic depressions on Mars. These small-scale and relict bedforms were first seen in narrow-angle images from the Mars Orbiter Camera (MOC) and were called "ridges" to preserve both dunes and ripples as formative mechanisms. While TARs are widespread on Mars, their formation, age, composition, and role in past Martian sediment cycles remain poorly constrained.

== Aeolian bedforms ==
Aeolian bedforms are typically classified into either ripples or dunes based on their morphologies and formative mechanisms. Dunes are larger (>0.5 m or taller on Earth), typically asymmetrical in cross-profile, and are the product of hydrodynamic instability related to sand flux, the local topography, shear stress exerted by the wind on sand grains, and flow-form interactions induced by the topography of the dune itself. Wind ripples by comparison are small (amplitudes of 0.6 – 15 mm), are more symmetrical in profile, and are created by saltating and reptating sand grains that tend for form a regular pattern of impact and shadow zones.

On Mars, TARs represent some intermediate form with characteristics of both ripples and dunes. TARs are typically symmetrical in profile similar to wind ripples. However, TARs are several orders of magnitude larger than wind ripples observed on Mars or Earth. TARs are much smaller than Martian dunes, do not have slip-faces, and do not have the characteristic dune stoss and leeslopes. Furthermore, while TARs and dunes have approximately basaltic signatures on Mars, TARs have lower thermal inertias than dunes, indicating that TARs on their surfaces are composed of smaller particles than dunes. Some features on Earth have been proposed as proxies for TARs: gravel megaripples in Argentina, megaripples in Iran and Libya, and reversing dunes in Idaho, but an exact analog remains elusive.

== Morphologies ==
TARs also exhibit a range of morphologies, which are interpreted as representing different formative and evolutionary processes. Past efforts have been made to categorize TAR with classification systems primarily focusing on crest morphology.

The morphologies of Transverse Aeolian ridges
Morphology	Description	Example image	HiRISE image source
Simple	Straight parallel crests		https://www.uahirise.org/ESP_045814_1520
Forked	Straight parallel crests with forking		https://www.uahirise.org/ESP_045814_1520
Sinuous	Winding but non-overlapping crests		https://www.uahirise.org/PSP_002824_1355
Barchan-like	Relatively short crests bent at ~90-150º		https://www.uahirise.org/ESP_036410_1810
Networked	Highly connected ridge crests that form closed irregular polygonal shapes		https://www.uahirise.org/PSP_002824_1355
Feathered*	Large primary ridge with smaller secondary ridges approximately perpendicular to the main crest		

*Established in the literature but not recognized as a distinct morphology

== Formation ==
There are competing hypotheses for TAR formation. Granule ripples covered by a monolayer of coarse millimeter-sized particles have been proposed for smaller TARs (amplitude <1 m), while dust-covered reversing dunes have been proposed for TARs >1 m in amplitude.

== Past climate ==
Understanding TAR formation and evolution could offer insight into the winds that created them. In turn, these inferences could have further insights into past wind patterns, atmospheric compositions, and climatic dynamics generally on Mars. Relict aeolian features exist on Earth and are useful records of local and atmospheric conditions, but the rapid erosion rates on Earth erase aeolian features older than the approximately the Last Glacial Maximum. Resurfacing rates are much slower on Mars so TARs could preserve conditions considerably further back in the Martian past.

== Current activity ==
A 2020 study found evidence that some isolated TARs could still be minimally active (i.e. ridge crests that are moving or changing), but the literature suggests that the majority of TARs are immobile. For example, dunes have been observed passing over TARs with no change to the underlying TARs after the dune's passing.

== Images of TARs ==
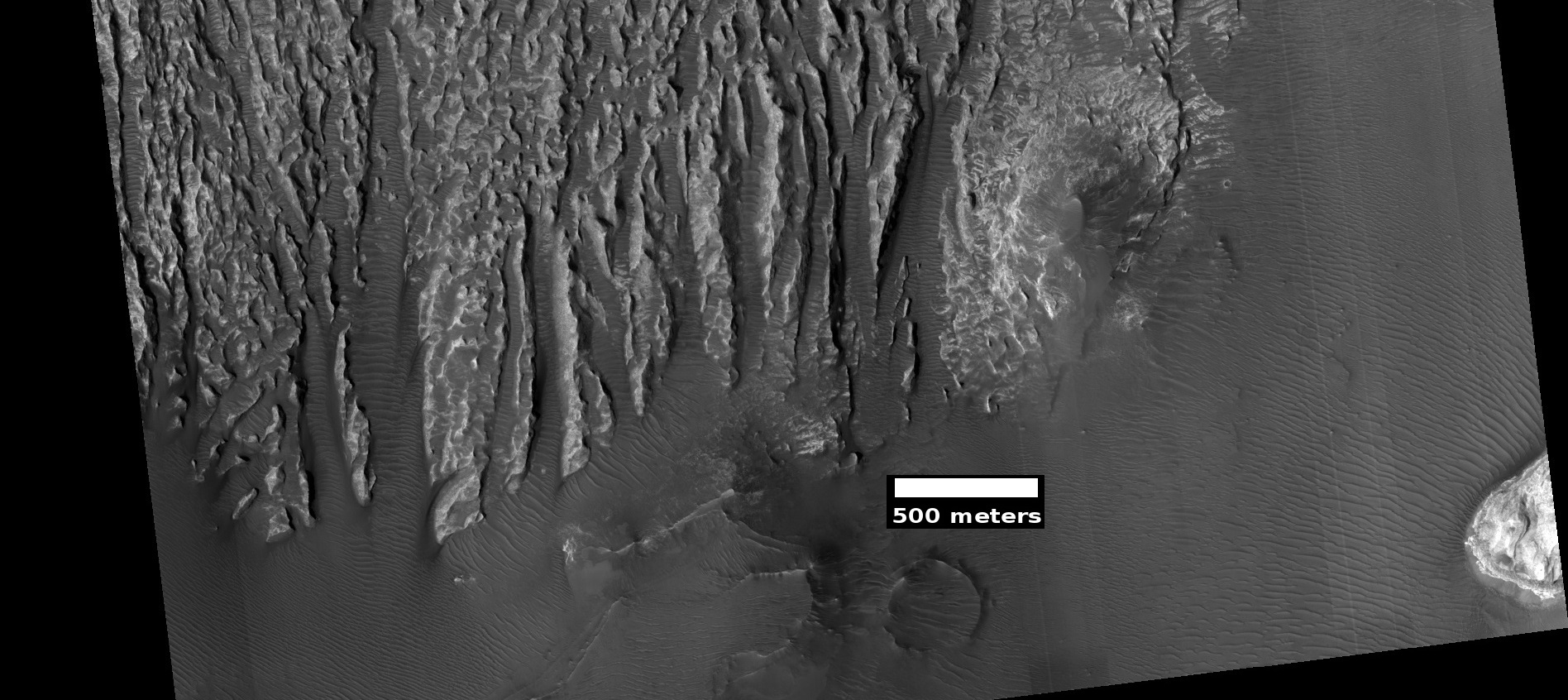
Yardangs, as seen by HiRISE under HiWish program. Location is Arsinoes Chaos. The next image shows part of this enlarged so that TAR's can be seen.

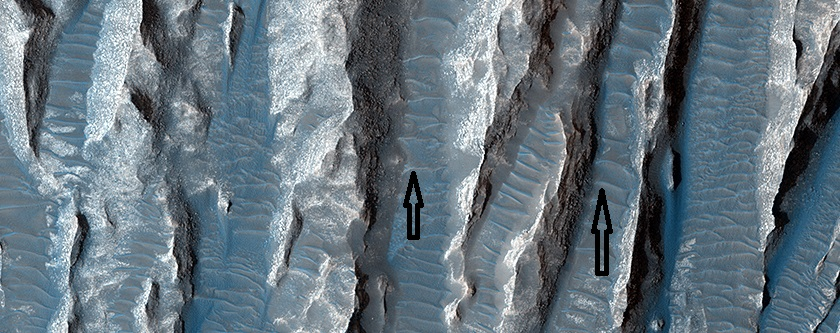
Close-up of yardangs, as seen by HiRISE under HiWish program. Arrows point to sand ridges that are called "transverse aeolian ridges" (TAR's).

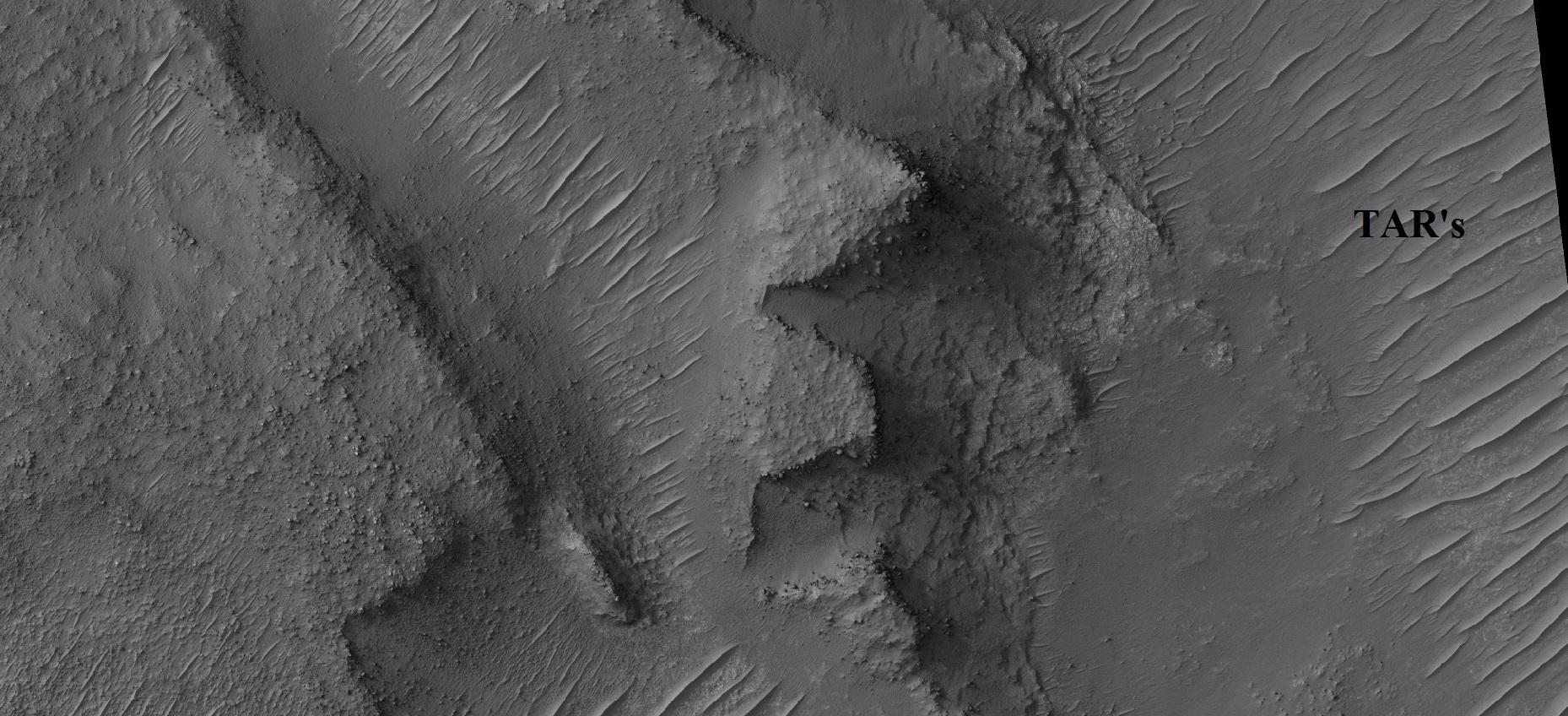
Layers in depression in crater, as seen by HiRISE under HiWish program A special type of sand ripple called Transverse aeolian ridges, TAR's are visible and labeled. Location is Hellas Planitia in Noachis quadrangle.
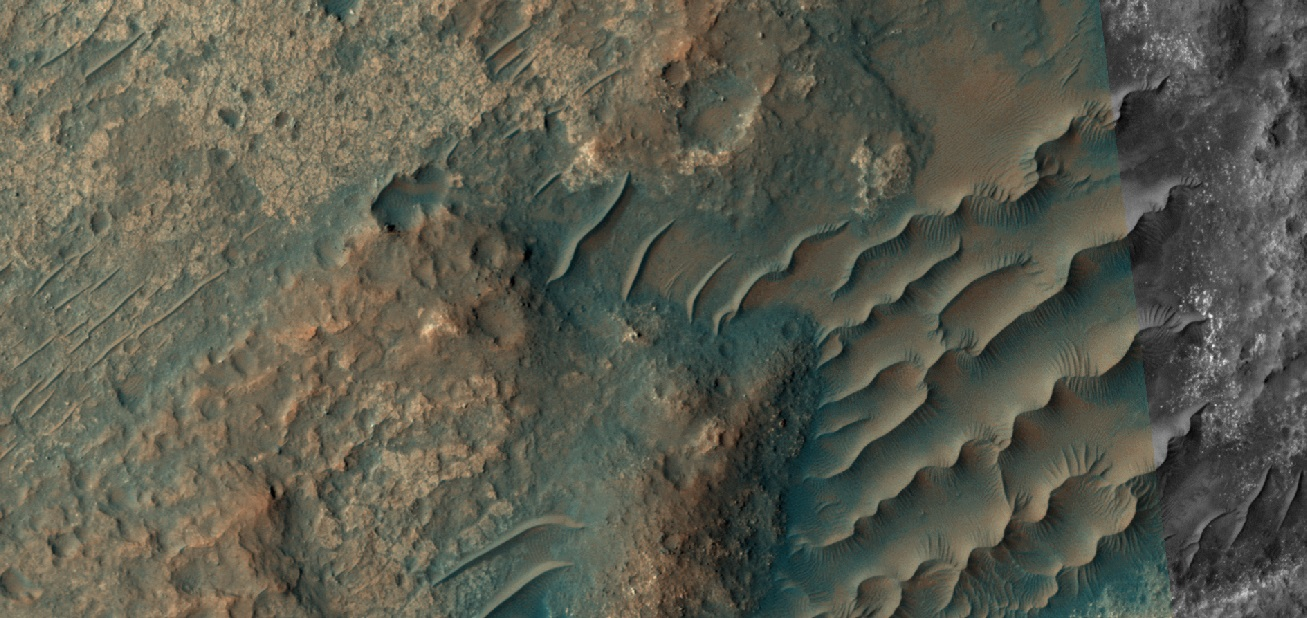
Close, color view of unusual transverse aeolian ridges, TAR's, as seen by HiRISE under HiWish program These features may have had variable local winds to make the wavy tops.

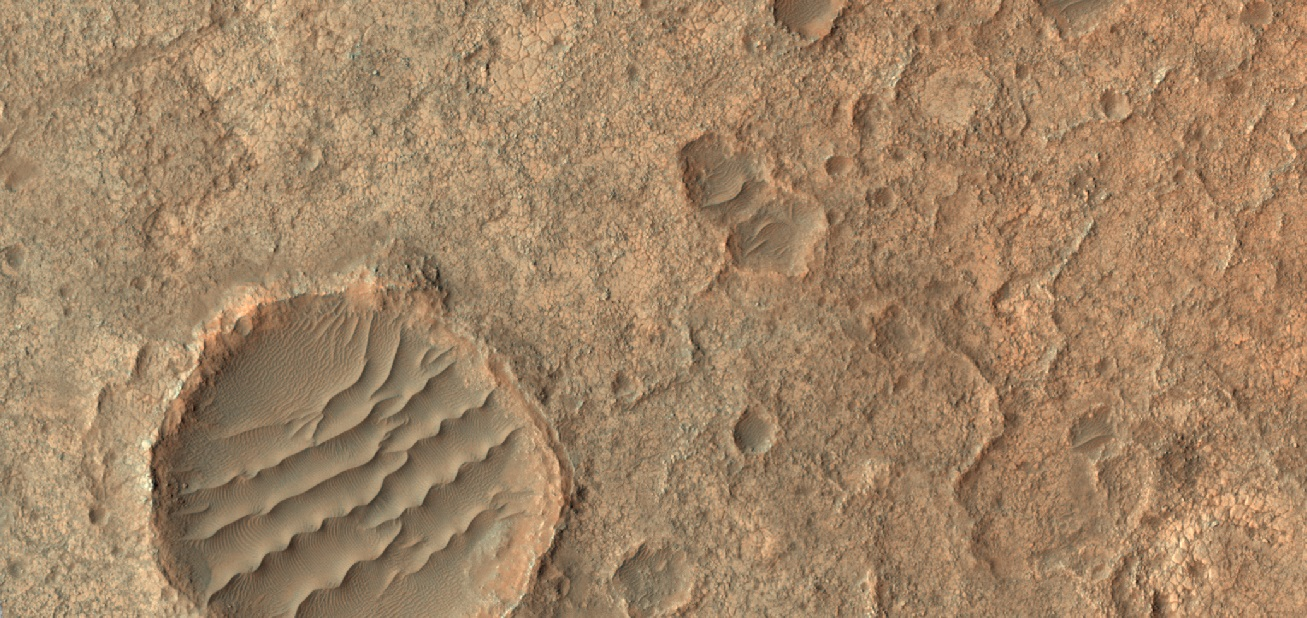
Close view of TAR's with waves, as seen by HiRISE under HiWish program

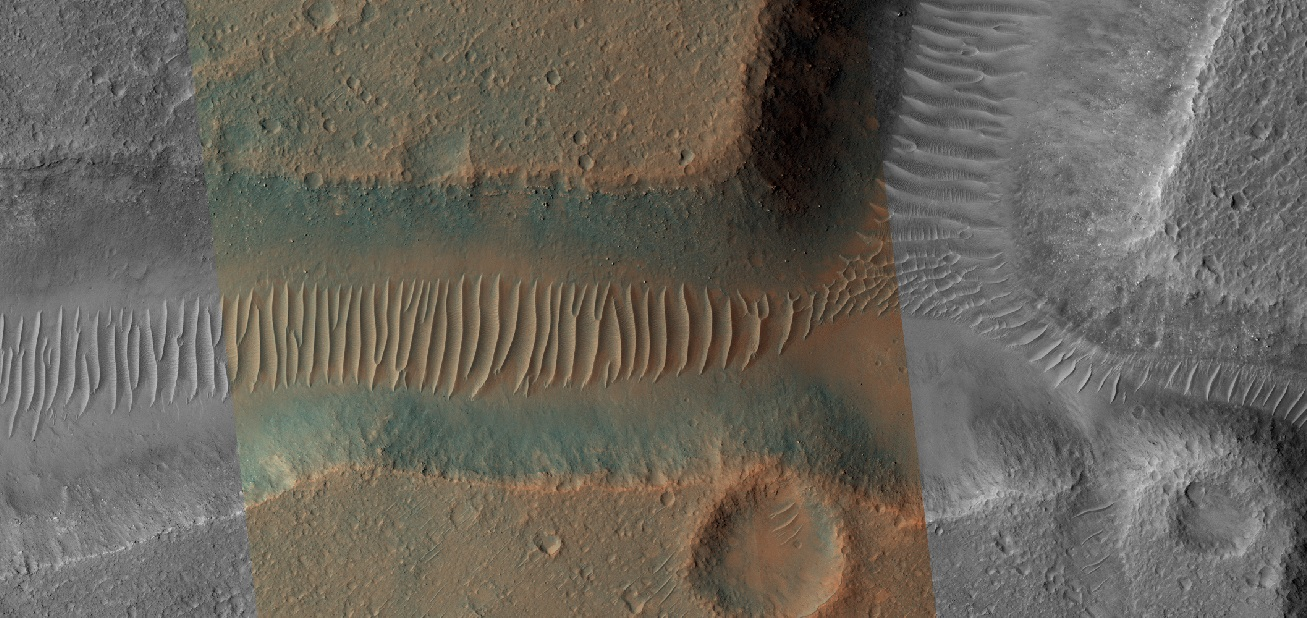
Close, color view of TAR's in a channel, as seen by HiRISE under HiWish program Only part of the image is in color because HiRISE only takes a 1 km wide color strip.

== See also ==
- Dunes
- Ripples
- Mars
- Aeolian processes
- Aeolian landforms
