= Paleocurrent =

Geological indicator of water flow

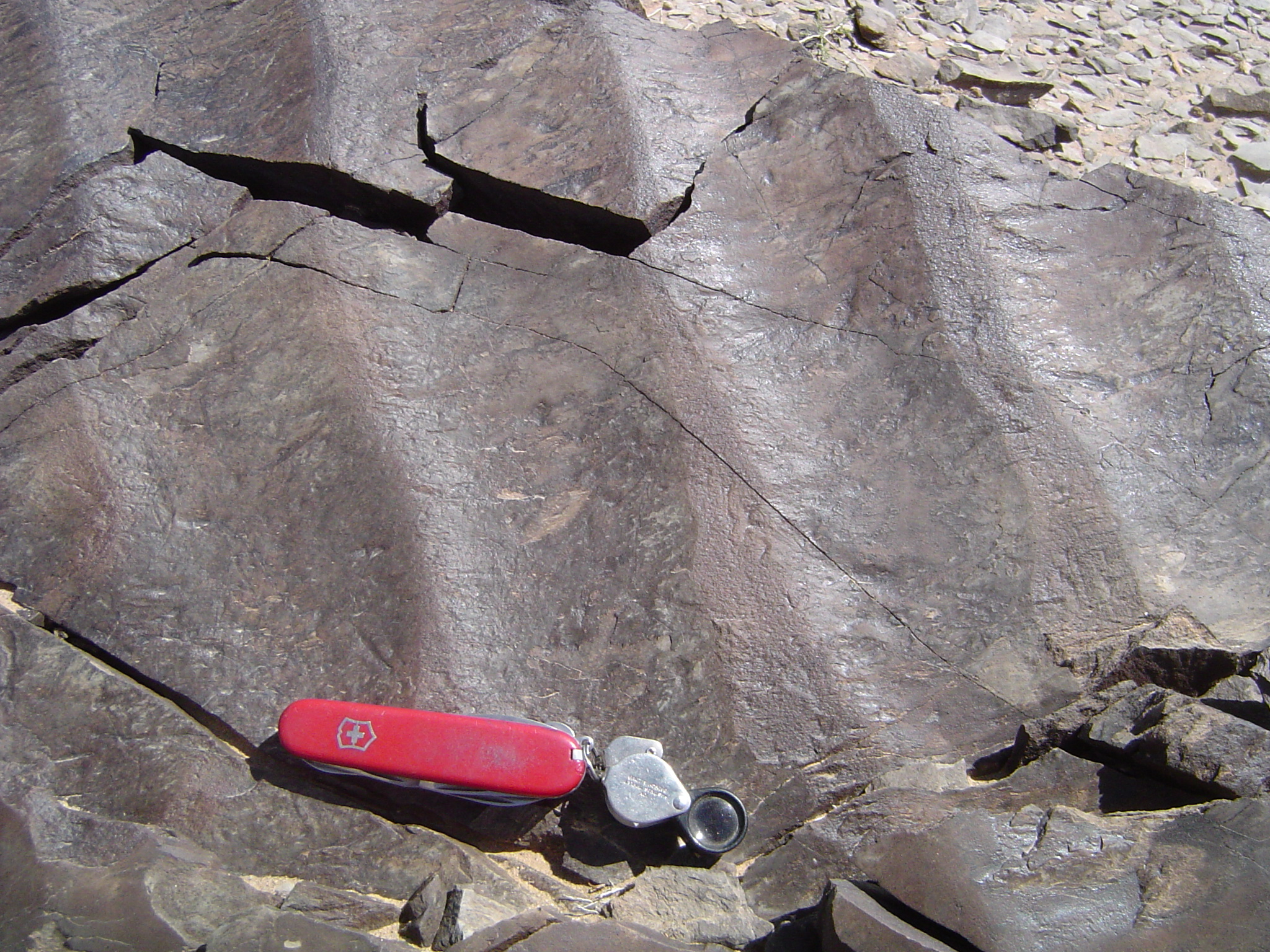
Bidirectional wave ripple, Nomgon, Mongolia

A paleocurrent or paleocurrent indicator is a geological feature (typically a sedimentary structure) that helps one determine the direction of flowing water in the geologic past. This is an invaluable tool in the reconstruction of ancient depositional environments.

There are two main types of paleocurrent indicators:

- Unidirectional, which give a clear, single direction of flow
- Bidirectional, which give a good linear direction, but it is unclear which direction along the linear trend the water flowed.

Paleocurrents are usually measured with an azimuth, or as a rake on a bedding plane, and displayed with a Rose Diagram to show the dominant direction(s) of flow. This is needed because in some depositional environments, like meandering rivers, the paleocurrent resulting from natural sinuosity has a natural variation of 180 degrees or more.

Below are a partial list of common paleocurrent indicators:

== Unidirectional ==
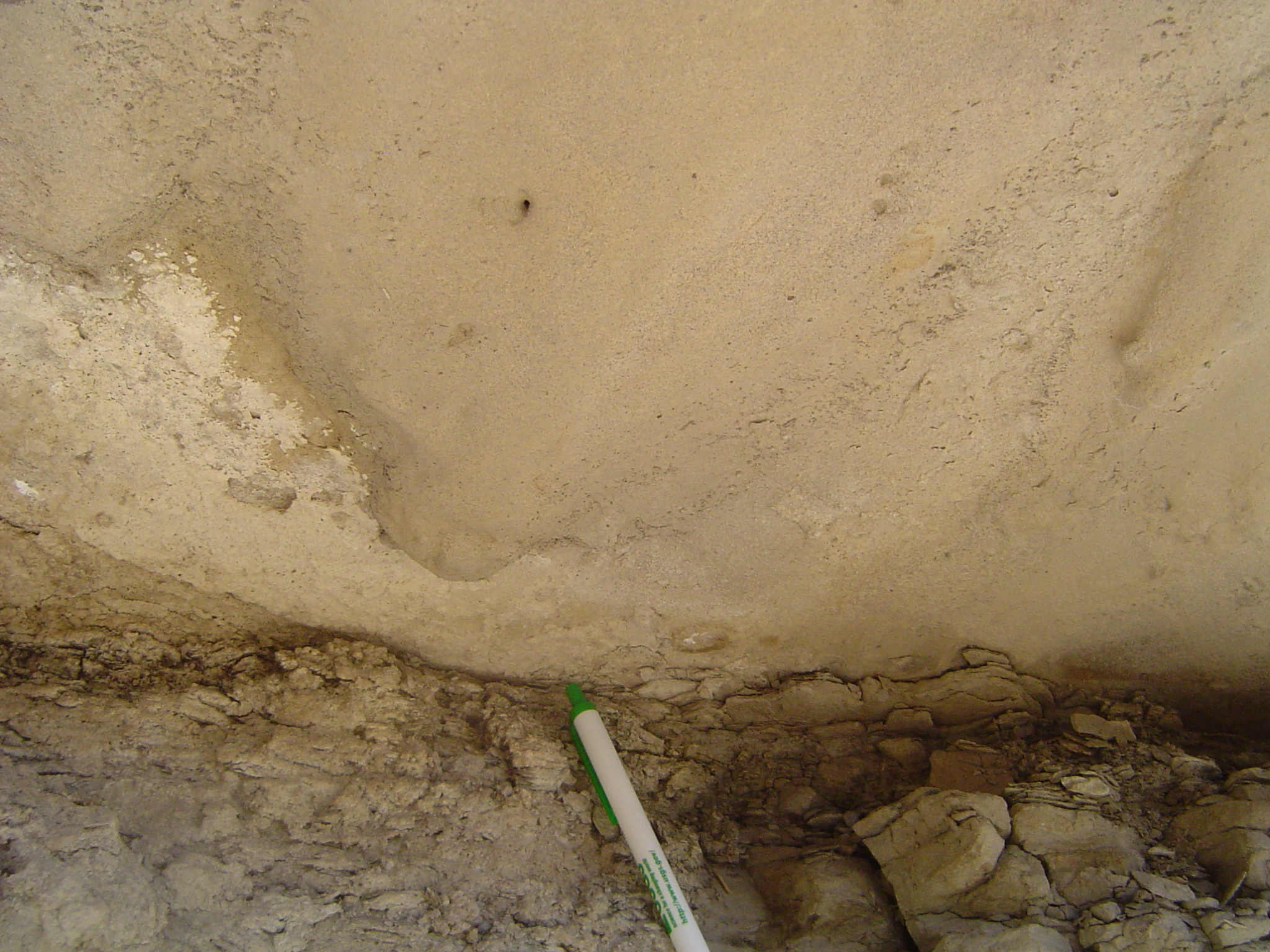
Flute cast, showing paleocurrent to the upper right of pic

- Cross-bedding – the axis of a trough cross bed or the down-dip direction of a tabular cross bed point the direction of paleo flow.
- Current ripple marks – will have the short side of the ripple pointing down stream.
- Sole markings/flute casts – the short, steep side will point up stream, and the long, tapered side points down stream.
- Imbrication – clasts line up in the direction of flow.

== Bidirectional ==
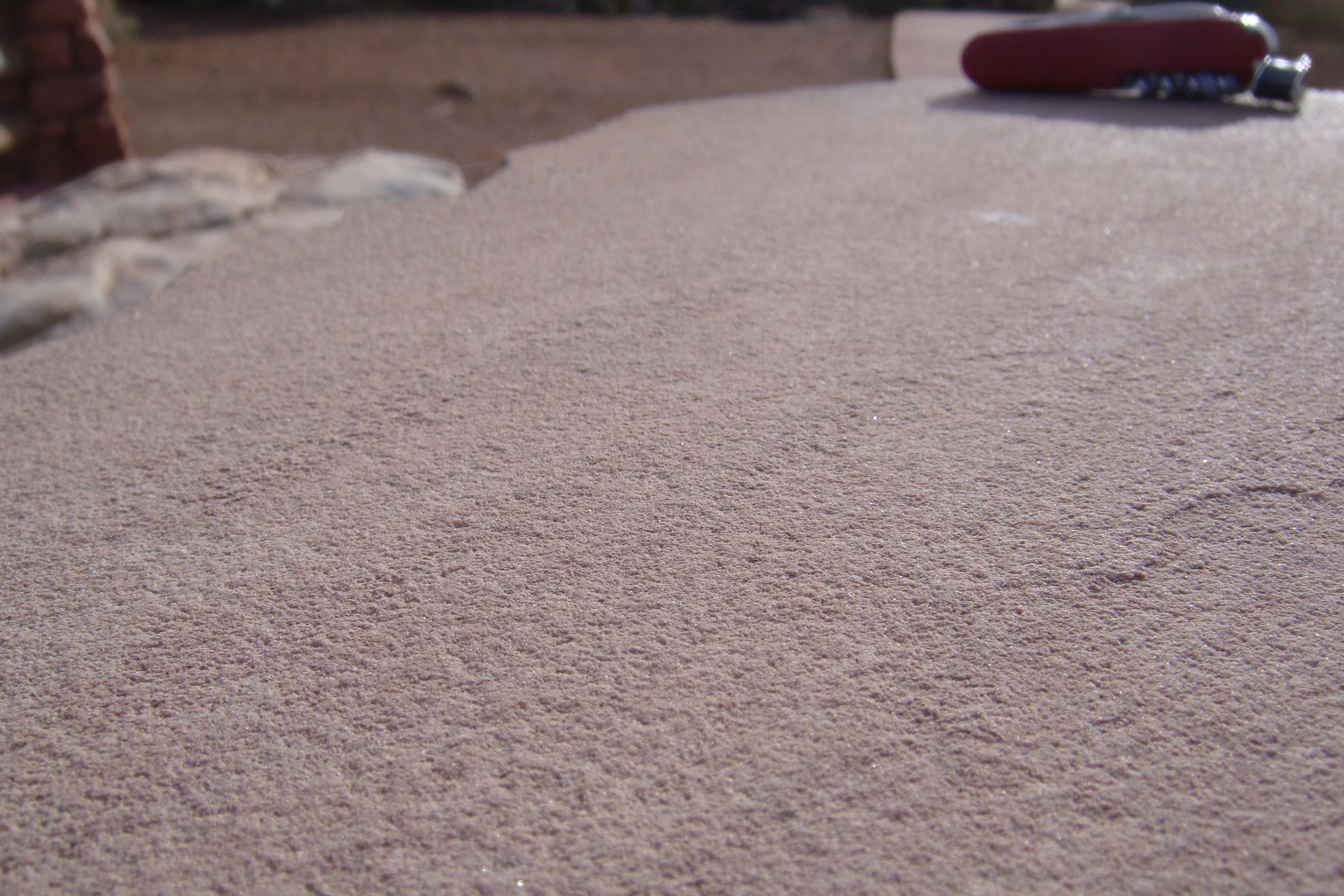
Parting lineation, from lower right to upper left; Kayenta Formation, Canyonlands National Park.

- Symmetrical ripple marks – flow is perpendicular to the ridge crest.
- Tool mark – flow is along the mark.
- Parting lineations – flow is along the grains.
