= Bedform =

Geological feature resulting from the movement of bed material by fluid flow

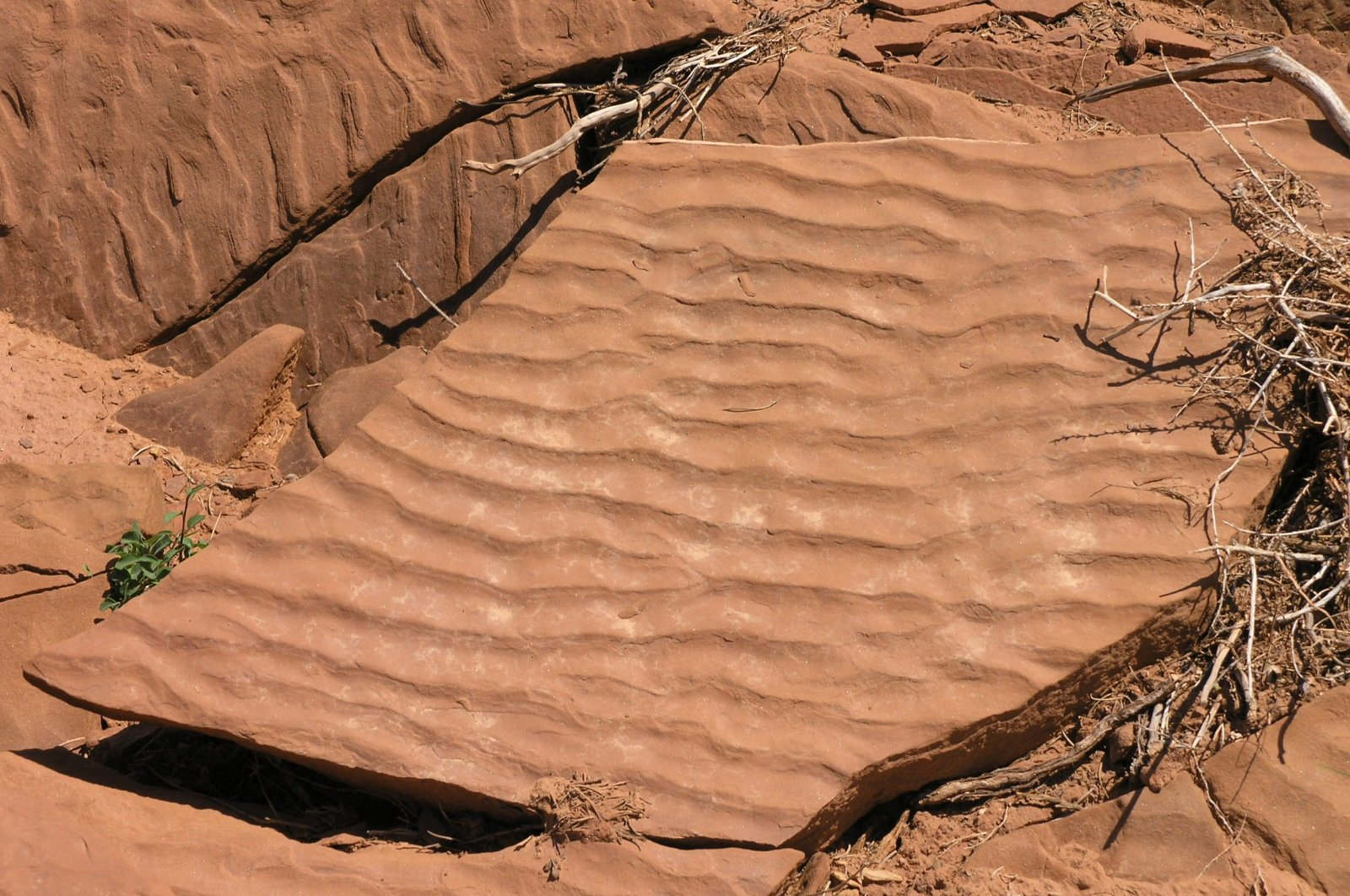
Current ripples preserved in sandstone of the Moenkopi Formation, Capitol Reef National Park, Utah, United States.

A bedform is a geological feature that develops at the interface of fluid and a moveable bed, the result of bed material being moved by fluid flow. Examples include ripples and dunes on the bed of a river. Bedforms are often preserved in the rock record as a result of being present in a depositional setting. Bedforms are often characteristic to the flow parameters, and may be used to infer flow depth and velocity, and therefore the Froude number.

== Bedforms Initiation ==
Bedforms are omnipresent in many environments (e.g., fluvial, eolian, glaciofluvial, deltaic and deep sea), although there is still some debate on how they develop. There are two separate, though not mutually exclusive, models of bedform initiation: defect initiation and instantaneous initiation.

=== Defect Initiation ===
The defect theory proposes that the turbulent sweeps that are generated in turbulent flows entrain sediment that upon deposition generates defects in a non-cohesive material. These deposits then propagate downstream via a flow separation process, thus developing bedform fields. The origin of the defects is thought to be linked to packets of hairpin vortex structures. These coherent turbulent structures give rise to entrainment corridors on the mobile bed, forming grain lineations that interact with the low-speed streaks generating an agglomeration of grains. Once a critical height of grains is reached, flow separation occurs over the new structure. Sediment will be eroded close from the reattachment point and deposited downstream creating a new defect. This new defect will thus induce formation of another defect and the process will continue, propagating downstream while the accumulations of grains quickly evolve into small bedforms.

=== Instantaneous Initiation ===
In general, the defect propagation theory plays a bigger role at low sediment transport rates since for high rates defects maybe washed away and bedforms generally initiated across the entire bed spontaneously. Venditti et al. (2005) report that instantaneous initiation begins with the formation of a cross-hatch pattern, which leads to chevron-shaped forms that migrate independently of the pattern structure. This chevron-like structure reorganizes to form the future crest lines of the bedforms. Venditti et al. (2006), based on the earlier model by Liu (1957), proposed that instantaneous initiation is a manifestation of an interfacial hydrodynamic instability of Kelvin-Helmholtz type between a highly active pseudofluid sediment layer and the fluid above it. In addition, Venditti et al. (2005) imply that there is no linkage between the instantaneous initiation and coherent turbulent flow structures, since spatially- and temporally-random events should lock in place to generate the cross-hatch pattern. Moreover, there is no clear explanation of the effect of turbulence in the formation of bedforms since bedforms may also occur under laminar flows. Laminar-generated bedform studies used the temporally-averaged flow conditions to determine the degree of turbulence, indicating Reynolds number in the laminar regime. However, instantaneous process, such as burst and sweeps, which are infrequent at low Reynolds number but still present, can be the driving mechanisms to generate the bedforms. The generation of bedforms in laminar flows is still a topic of debate within the scientific community, since if true, it suggests that there should be other processes for defect development other than the one suggested by Best (1992). This alternative model for bedform development at low sediment transport rates should explain the generation of defects and bedforms for cases where the flow is not turbulent.

== Bedform phase diagrams ==
Phase or stability diagrams are defined as graphs that show the regimes of existence of one or more stable bed states. The stability of the bed can be defined when the bedform is in equilibrium and does not change in time for the same flow condition. This invariance over time must not be confused with a static morphology or frozen equilibrium; on the contrary, the bed moves and adjusts in a dynamic equilibrium with the flow and sediment transport for that particular condition. These phase diagrams are used for two main purposes: i) for prediction of bed states in a known flow and sediment transport condition, and, ii) as a tool for the reconstruction of paleoenvironments from a known bed state or sedimentary structure. Despite the great utility of such diagrams, they are very difficult to construct, making them either incomplete or very hard to interpret. This complexity lies in the number of variables needed to quantify the system.

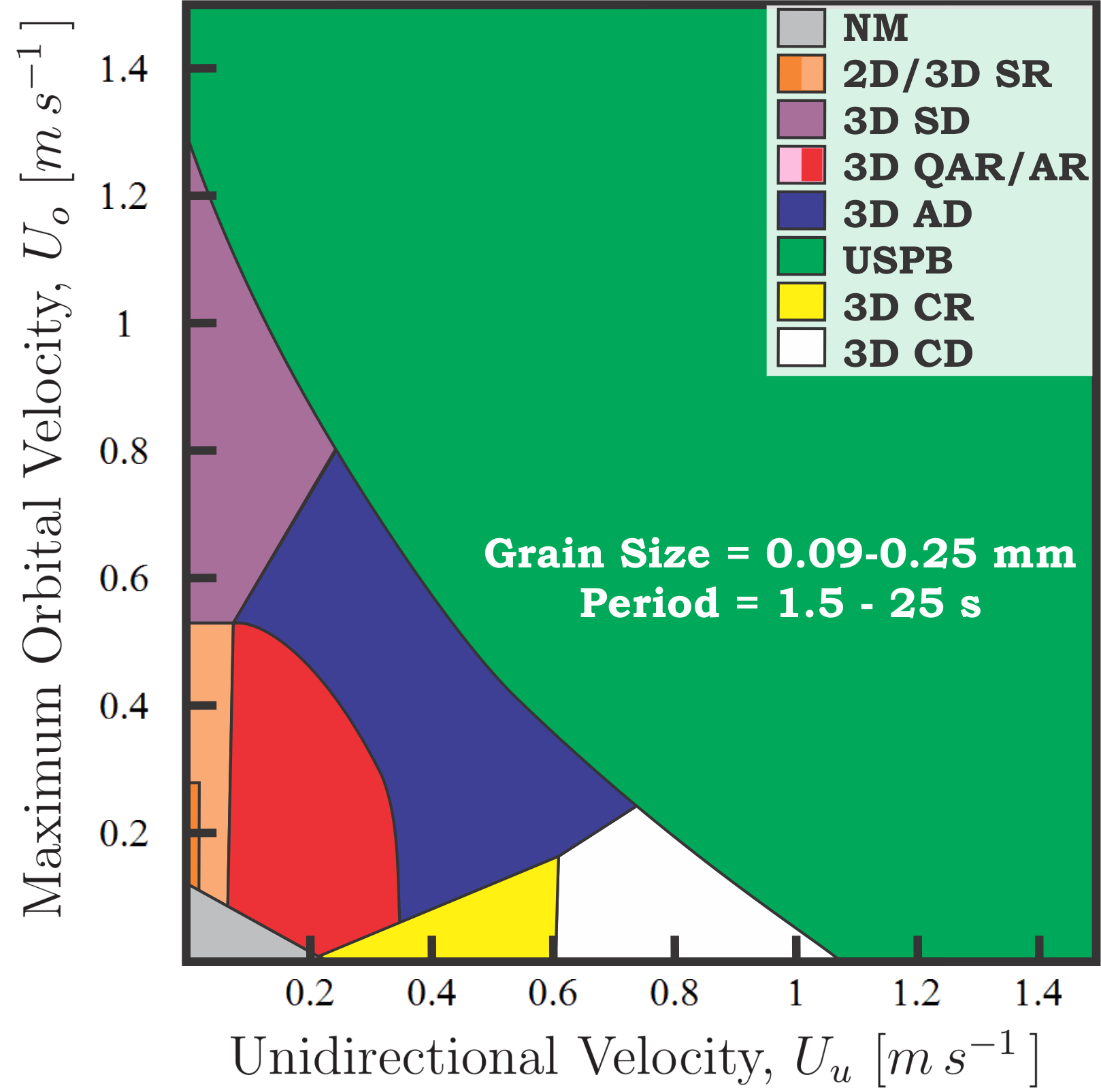
Dimensional phase diagram for combined flows. Relationships of combined-flow bed-phases stability fields in a plot of Oscillatory vs Unidirectional velocity.

== Bedforms vs. flow ==
Typical unidirectional bedforms represent a specific flow velocity, assuming typical sediments (sands and silts) and water depths, and a chart such as below can be used for interpreting depositional environments, with increasing water velocity going down the chart.

Flow Regime	Bedform	Preservation Potential	Identification Tips
Lower
Lower	Lower plane bed	High	Flat laminae, almost lack of current
Lower	Ripple marks	High	Small, cm-scale undulations
Lower	Sand waves	Medium to low	Rare, longer wavelength than ripples
Lower	Dunes/Megaripples	High	Large, meter-scale ripples
Upper
Upper	Upper plane bed	High	Flat laminae, +/- aligned grains (parting lineations)
Upper	Antidunes	Low	Water in phase with bedform, low angle, subtle laminae
Upper	Pool and chute	Very low	Mostly erosional features

This chart is for general use, because changes in grain size and flow depth can change the bedform present and skip bedforms in certain scenarios. Bidirectional environments (e.g. tidal flats) produce similar bedforms, but the reworking the sediments and opposite directions of flow complicates the structures.

This bed form sequence can also be illustrated diagrammatically:

Bedforms formed in sand in channels under unidirectional flow. Numbers correspond broadly to increasing flow regime, i.e., increasing water flow velocity. Blue arrows show schematically flow lines in the water above the bed. Flow is always from left to right.

== Types of Bedforms ==
=== Lower Plane Bed ===
"Lower plane bed" refers to the flat configuration the bed of a river that is produced in via low rates of sediment transport.

=== Upper Plane Bed ===
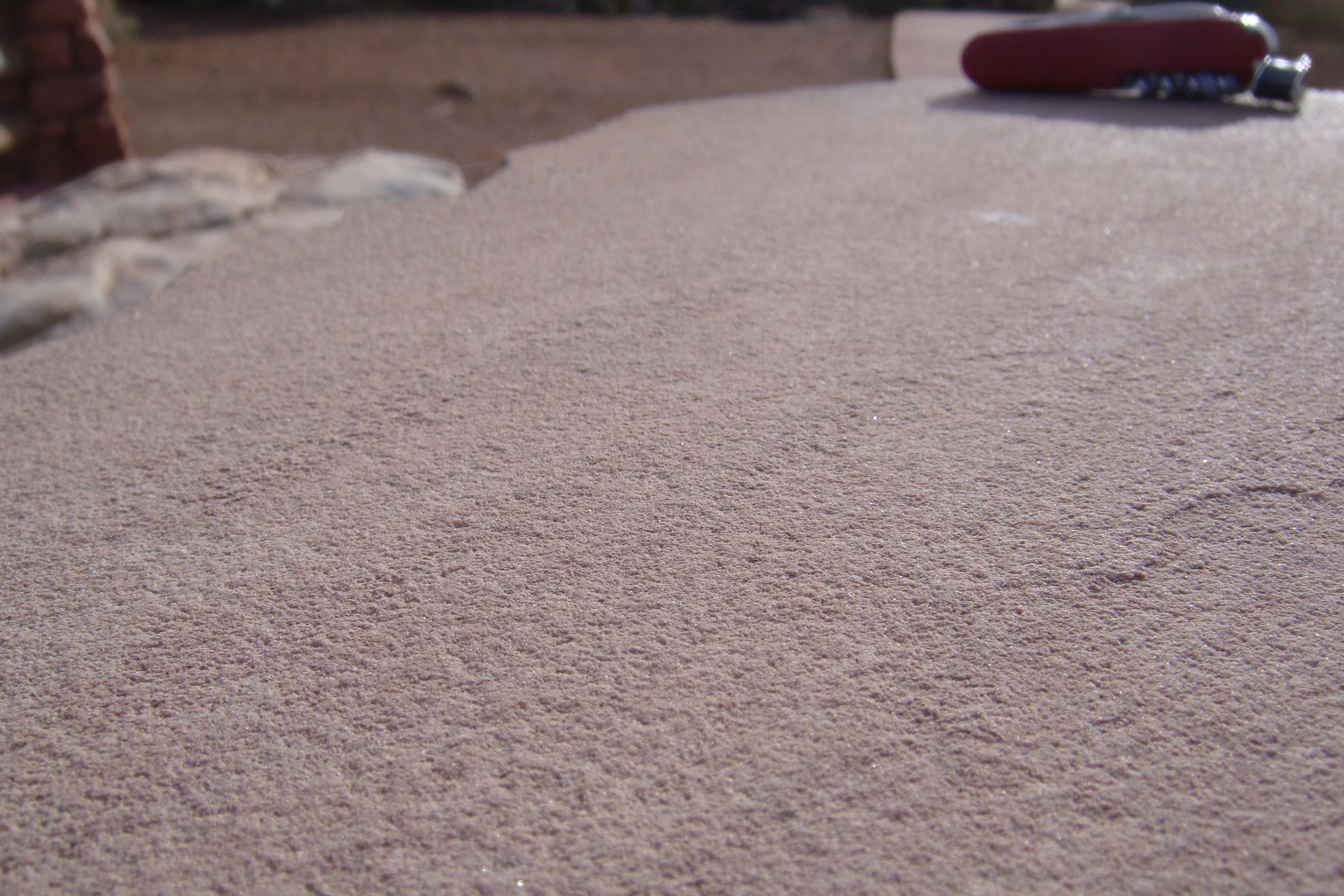
Parting lineation, from lower left to upper right; Kayenta Formation, Canyonlands National Park.

"Upper plane bed" features are flat and characterized by a unidirectional flow with high rates of sediment transport as both bed load and suspended load. Upper plane bed conditions can produce parting current lineations, which are typically subtle streaks on the bed surface due to the high energy flow.

== See also ==
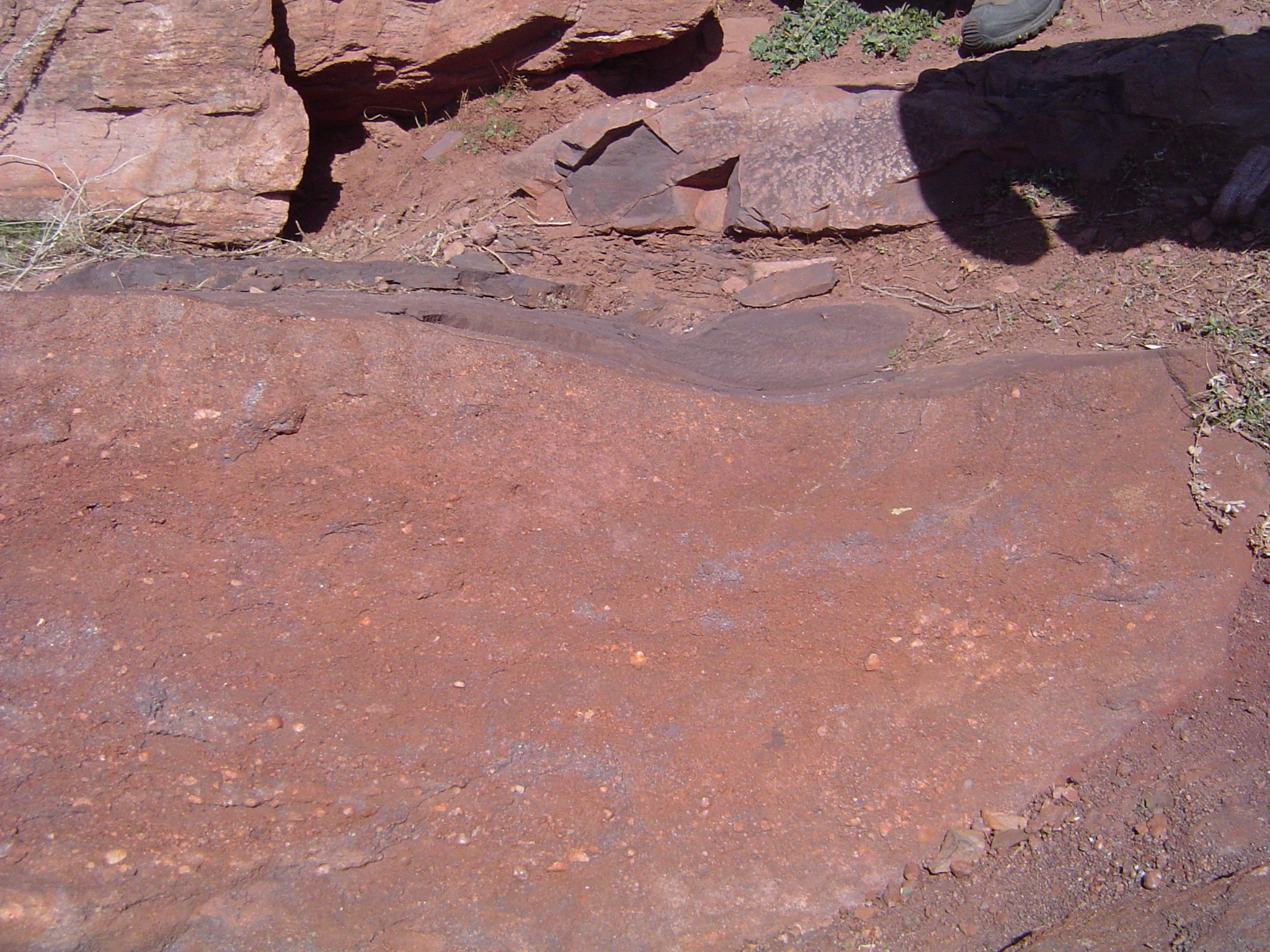
Megaripple from Utah

- Churn turbulent flow – Highly agitated, chaotic fluid motion
- Sedimentation – Tendency for particles in suspension to settle down
- Sedimentary structures – Geologic structures formed during sediment deposition
