= Strombolian eruption =

Type of volcanic eruption with relatively mild explosive intensity or spattering

A diagram of a strombolian eruption: 1: ash plume, 2: lapilli, 3: volcanic ash fall, 4: lava fountain, 5: volcanic bomb, 6: lava flow, 7: layers of lava and ash, 8: stratum, 9: dike, 10: magma conduit, 11: magma chamber, 12: sill

In volcanology, a Strombolian eruption is a type of volcanic eruption with relatively mild blasts, typically having a Volcanic Explosivity Index of 1 or 2. Strombolian eruptions consist of ejection of incandescent scoria which can range from small lapilli, to larger volcanic bombs, to altitudes of tens to a few hundreds of metres. The eruptions are small to medium in volume, with sporadic violence. This type of eruption is named for the Italian volcano Stromboli.

The tephra typically glows red when leaving the vent, but its surface cools and assumes a dark to black color and may significantly solidify before impact. The tephra accumulates in the vicinity of the vent, forming a cinder cone. Scoria is the most common product; the amount of volcanic ash is typically rather minor or absent.

The lava flows are more viscous, and therefore shorter and thicker, than the corresponding Hawaiian eruptions; it may or may not be accompanied by production of pyroclastic rock and lava flows.

Instead the gas coalesces into bubbles, called gas slugs, that grow large enough to rise through the magma column, bursting near the top due to the decrease in pressure and throwing magma into the air. Each episode thus releases volcanic gases, sometimes as frequently as a few minutes apart. Gas slugs can form as deep as 3 kilometers, making them difficult to predict.

A typical eruption of Stromboli

Strombolian eruptive activity can be very long-lasting because the conduit system is not strongly affected by the eruptive activity so that the eruptive system can repeatedly reset itself.

Monogenetic cones usually erupt in the Strombolian style. For example, the Parícutin volcano erupted continuously from 1943 to 1952; Mount Erebus, Antarctica, has produced Strombolian eruptions for at least many decades from its lava, which periodically explodes; and Stromboli itself has been producing Strombolian eruptions for over two thousand years. The Romans refer to Stromboli as the "Lighthouse of the Mediterranean."

== Violent Strombolian ==
The most energetic Strombolian eruptions are sometimes termed "Violent Strombolian" by volcanologists. Such eruptions are associated with higher magma gas content, leading to a turbulent churn flow regime in the conduit, producing stronger and much more frequent explosions.

Paroxysm of Mt. Etna in 2013

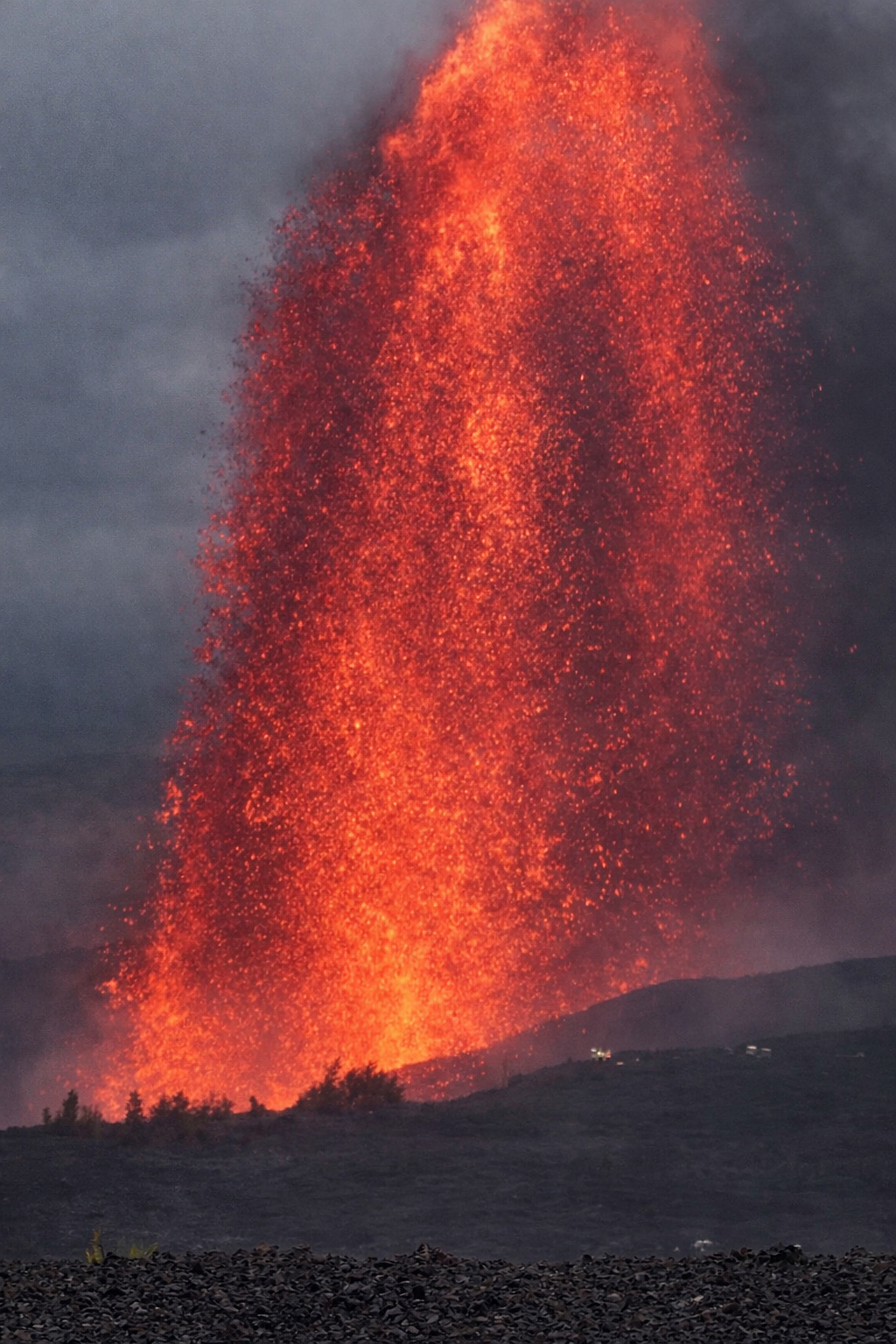
Violent strombolian lava fountaining at Kīlauea

Violent Strombolian eruptions are more explosive in nature than their regular counterparts (up to VEI 3), and may produce sustained lava fountains, long distance lava flows, eruption columns several kilometres in height, and heavy ash fallout. Rarely, Violent Strombolian eruptions may transition into Subplinian eruptions.

Examples of Violent Strombolian activity include the paroxysms of Mt. Etna, the 1943-1952 eruption of Parícutin, the 2021 Cumbre Vieja eruption, and various eruptions of Mt. Vesuvius between 1631 and 1944. The 2024-2026 lava fountaining episodes at Kīlauea also share some characteristics with Violent Strombolian eruptions.

== See also ==
- Types of volcanic eruptions
