= Churn turbulent flow =

Highly agitated, chaotic fluid motion

Churn turbulent flow is a two-phase gas/liquid flow regime characterized by a highly-agitated flow where gas bubbles are sufficient in numbers to both interact with each other and, while interacting, coalesce to form larger distorted bubbles with unique shapes and behaviors in the system. This flow regime is created when there is a large gas fraction in a system with a high gas and low liquid velocity. It is an important flow regime to understand and model because of its predictive value in nuclear reactor vessel boiling flow.

== Occurrence ==
A flow in which the number of bubbles is low is called ideally-separated bubble flow. The bubbles don’t interact with each other. As the number of bubbles increase they start colliding each other. A situation then arises where they tend to coalesce to form cap bubbles, and the new flow pattern formed is called churn turbulent flow. The bubbles occurring in such a flow can be classified in small, large, and distorted bubbles. The small bubbles are generally spherical or elliptical and are encountered in a major concentration in the wake of large and distorted bubbles and close to the walls. Large, ellipsoidal or cap bubbles can be found in the core region of the flow as well as the distorted bubbles with a highly deformed interface.

Churn turbulent flow is commonly encountered in industrial applications. A typical example is boiling flow in nuclear reactors. Churn turbulent flow also occurs in the gas/magma mixture of strombolian volcanic eruptions.

== Numerical simulation of bubble column flows in churn turbulent regime ==
Numerical simulations of cylindrical bubble columns operating in the churn-turbulent regime have been carried out using an Euler–Euler approach incorporated with the RNG k–ε model for liquid turbulence. Several approaches have been carried out, including single-sized bubble modeling, double-sized bubble modeling, and the multiple sizes group modeling (MUSIG).

Breakup mass conserved formulations and coalescence rates mass conserved formulation was used in the computation of bubble size distributions. For single size modelling the Schiller–Naumann drag force was used, and for the modelling of MUSIG the Ishii–Zuber drag force was used. An empirical drag formulation was used for the double size bubble model. The simulation results of time-averaged axial velocity and gas holdup obtained with the three models were compared with reported experimental data in the resulting literature. After the comparison of all the three results it gets very clear that only MUSIG models with some lift force can replicate the measured radial distribution of gas holdup in the fully developed flow regime. The inhomogeneous MUSIG model gives a little better result than other models in the prediction of axial liquid velocity. For all the simulations the RNG k–ε model was used, and the results showed that this version of k–ε model did yield comparatively high rate of turbulence dissipation and high bubble breakup and, hence, a rational bubble size distribution formed. Here the ad hoc manipulation of the breakup rates was ignored. Mutual effects of drag force, mean bubble sizes, and turbulence characteristics profound from the simulation results. A decrease in the relative velocity between two phases is encounters due to an increase in the drag force, and this could result in decrease in k and ε. Low breakup rates results a large Sauter diameter which was directly connected to the dissipation rates of turbulence. Drag force is directly influenced by the change of Sauter diameter.
