= Imbrication (sedimentology) =

Overlapping aligned fragments in sedimentary rock

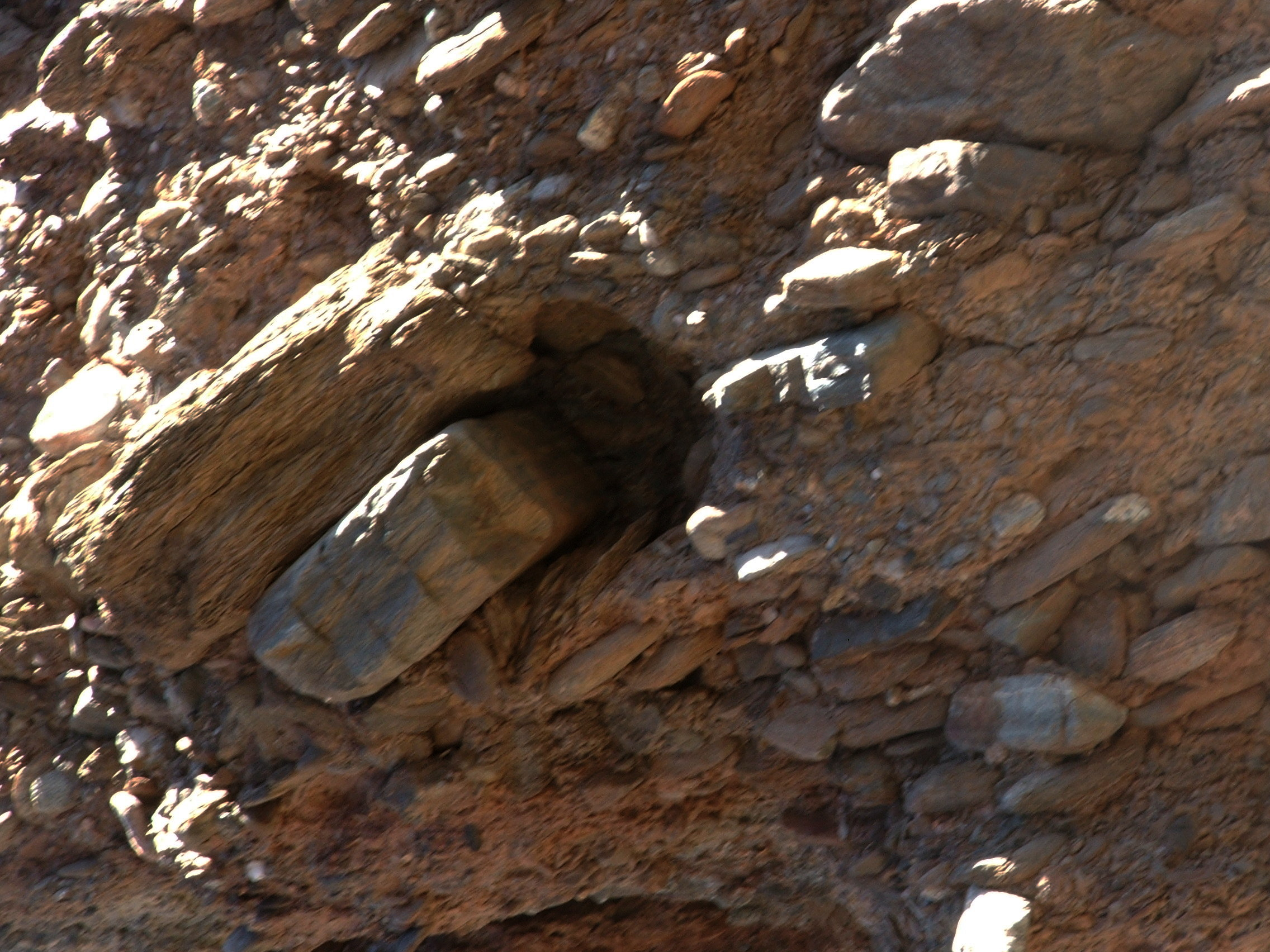
Imbricated clasts, with an implied flow direction of left to right.

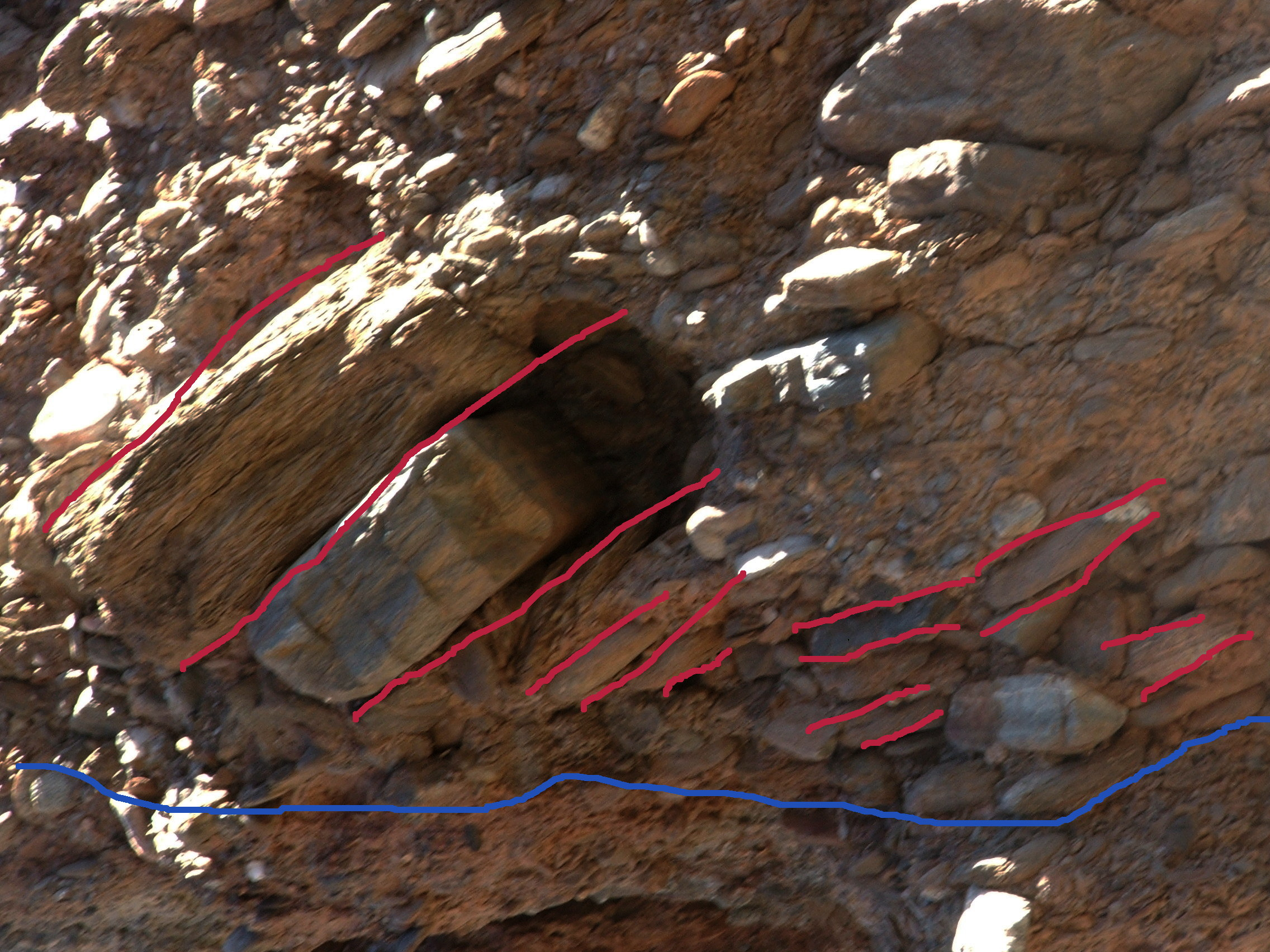
Note how the clasts are oriented at an angle to the base of the channel (blue line), which was originally approximately horizontal.

In sedimentology, imbrication is a primary depositional fabric consisting of a preferred orientation of clasts such that they overlap one another in a consistent fashion, rather like a run of toppled dominoes. Imbrication is observed in conglomerates and in some volcaniclastic deposits.

== Types ==
In conglomerates the shape of many clasts can be approximated to an ellipsoid, with a long axis (A), an intermediate axis (B) and a short axis (C).

- A-axis imbrication where the long axes of the clasts are oriented parallel to the flow direction. This fabric is characteristic of clasts carried in suspension and this is only preserved in the case of a fast-waning flow in which the clasts are deposited without any significant rolling. This fabric is typical of conglomerates at the base of turbidite beds but is also occasionally observed in alluvial fan deposits reworked by flash floods
- AB-plane imbrication where the long axes of the clasts are oriented perpendicular to the flow direction and the imbrication is of the flattened AB plane, with the intermediate axes in the flow direction. This fabric is characteristic of clasts carried as bedload. This imbrication forms as the clasts are rolled along the base of a channel. The flat clasts roll onto those downstream and come to rest with their downstream end propped up by the downstream pebbles and can be used to diagnose original flow directions.

=== Relation to paleocurrent ===
The type of imbrication is generally related to paleoflow direction. Wadell found the long axis aligned with paleocurrent, and dipping basinward in glacial sediments, whereas deltaic gravels may be oppositely inclined.
