= Ripple marks =

Wave structures created in sediments by bottom current

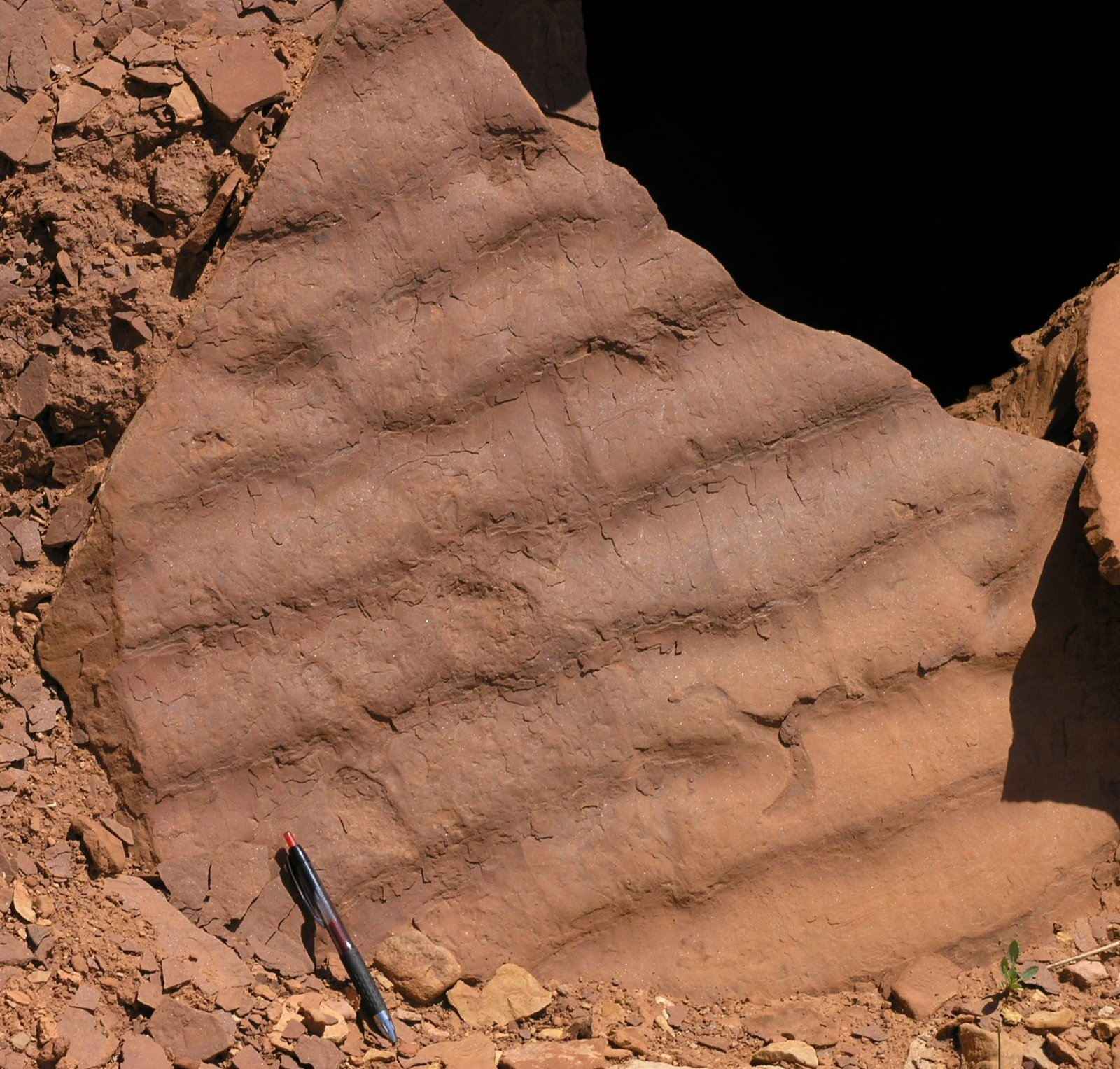
Ancient wave ripple marks in sandstone, Moenkopi Formation, Capitol Reef National Park, Utah

In geology, ripple marks are sedimentary structures (i.e., bedforms of the lower flow regime) and indicate agitation by water (current or waves) or directly by wind.

== Defining ripple cross-laminae and asymmetric ripples ==
- Current ripple marks, unidirectional ripples, or asymmetrical ripple marks are asymmetrical in profile, with a gentle up-current slope and a steeper down-current slope. The down-current slope is the angle of repose, which depends on the shape of the sediment. These commonly form in fluvial and aeolian depositional environments, and are a signifier of the lower part of the Lower Flow Regime.
- Ripple cross-laminae forms when deposition takes place during migration of current or wave ripples. A series of cross-laminae are produced by superimposing migrating ripples. The ripples form lateral to one another, such that the crests of vertically succeeding laminae are out of phase and appear to be advancing upslope. This process results in cross-bedded units that have the general appearance of waves in outcrop sections cut normal to the wave crests. In sections with other orientations, the laminae may appear horizontal or trough-shaped, depending upon the orientation and the shape of the ripples. Ripple cross-laminae will always have a steeper dip downstream, and will always be perpendicular to paleoflow meaning the orientation of the ripples will be in a direction that is ninety degrees to the direction that current if flowing. Scientists suggest current drag, or the slowing of current velocity, during deposition is responsible for ripple cross-laminae.

Types
Straight	Straight ripples generate cross-laminae that all dip in the same direction, and lie in the same plane. These forms of ripples are constructed by unidirectional flow of the current.
Sinuous	Sinuous ripples generate cross-laminae that are curvy. They show a pattern of curving up and down as shown in picture. Sinuous ripples produce trough cross lamination. All laminae formed under this type of ripple dip at an angle to the flow as well as downstream. These laminae are also formed by the unidirectional current.
Catenary	Catenary ripples generate cross-laminae that are curvy but have a unidirectional swoop. They show a pattern similar to what a repeated "W" would look like. Like the sinuous ripples, this form of ripple is created by unidirectional flow with the dip at an angle to the flow as well as downstream.
Linguoid / Lunate	Linguoid ripples have lee slope surfaces that are curved generating a laminae similar to caternary and sinuous ripples. Linguoid ripples generate an angle to the flow as well as downstream. Linguoid ripples have a random shape rather than a "W" shape, as described in the catenary description. Lunate ripples, meaning crescent shaped ripples, are exactly like linguoid ripples except that the stoss sides are curved rather than the lee slope. All other features are the same.

Size (scale)
Size	Description
Very small	Very small cross-lamination means that the ripple height is roughly one centimeter. It is lenticular, wavy and flaser lamination.
Small	Small cross-bedding are ripples set at a height less than ten centimeters, while the thickness is only a few millimeters. Some ripples that may fit this category are wind ripples, wave ripples, and current ripples.
Medium	Medium cross-lamination are ripples with a height greater than ten centimeters, and less than one meter in thickness. Some ripples that may fit this category would be current-formed sand waves, and storm-generated hummocky cross stratification.
Large	Large cross-bedding are ripples with a height greater than one meter, and a thickness equivalent to one meter or greater. Some ripples that may fit this category would be high energy river-bed bars, sand waves, epsilon cross-bedding and Gilbert-type cross-bedding.

== Ripple marks in different environments ==
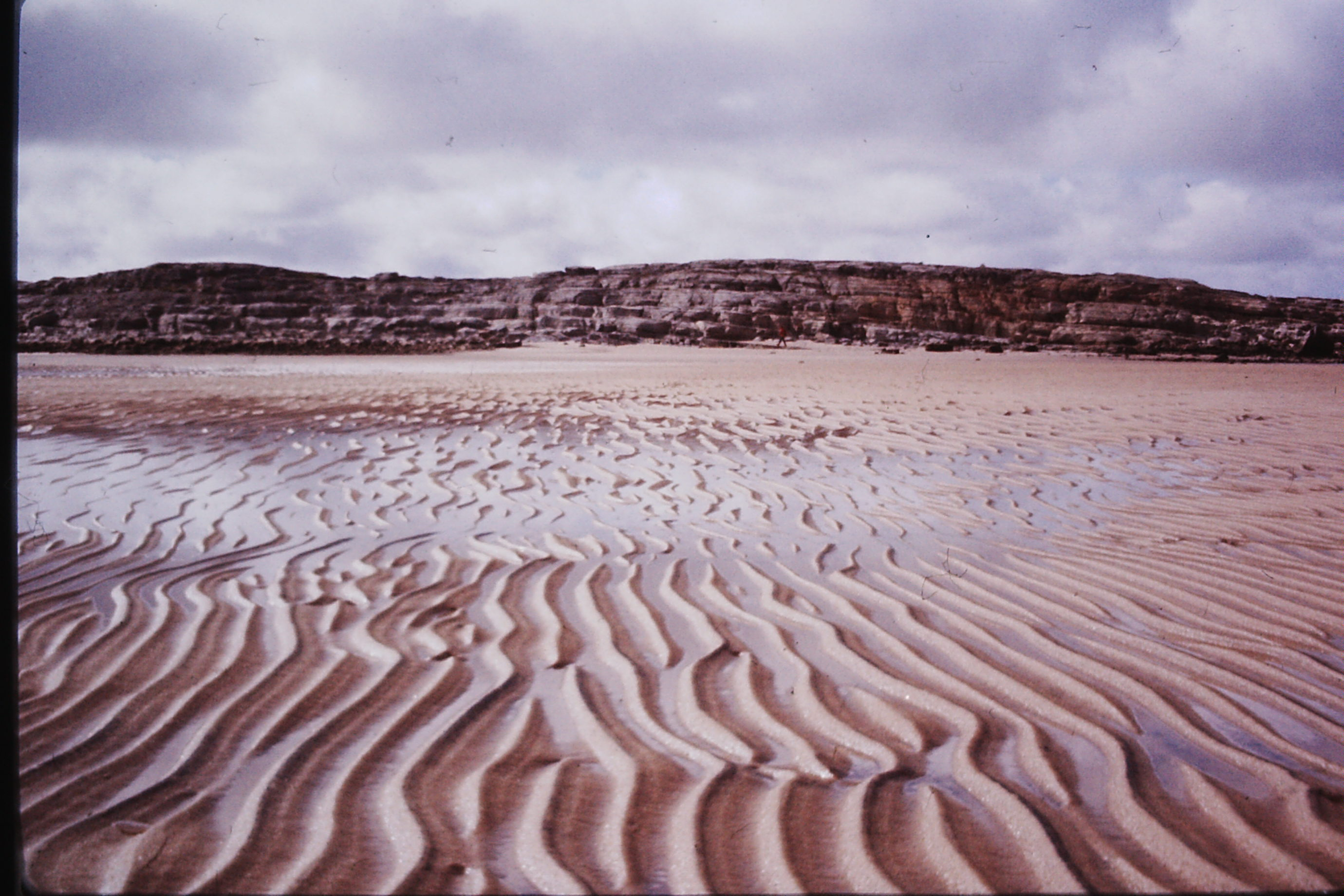
Ripple marks at Ile Mavert, Hudson Bay

=== Wave-formed ripples ===
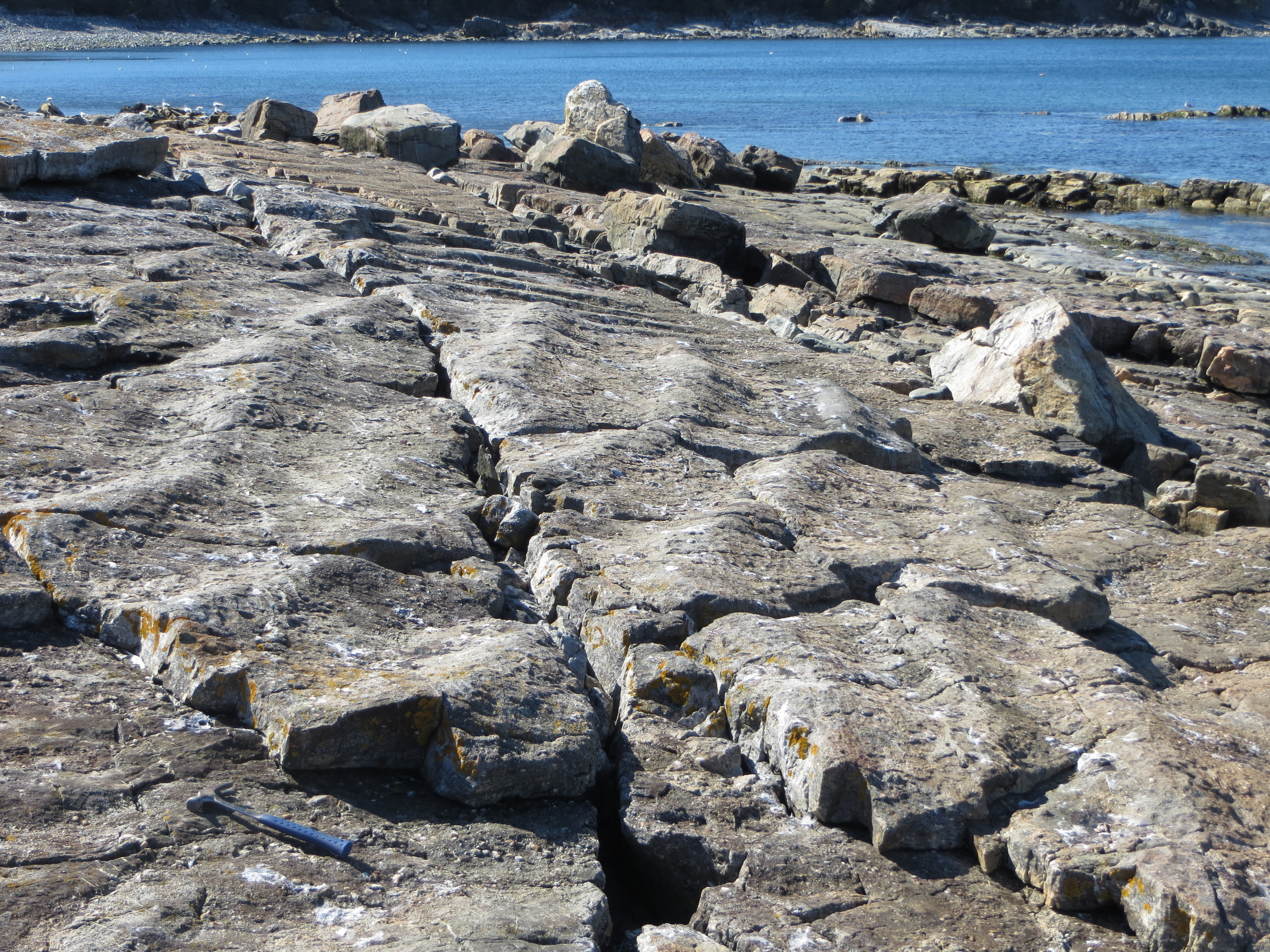
Tidal megaripples in the Random Formation in Newfoundland

Wave-formed ripples (also called bidirectional ripples, or symmetrical ripple marks) develop where oscillatory water motion generated by surface waves moves sediment across the bed. They commonly have approximately symmetrical profiles and straight or gently sinuous crests. Their geometry depends on factors including sediment grain size and the velocity and orbital diameter of the near-bed water motion.

Symmetry is not unique to wave-formed ripples, nor are all wave-formed ripples symmetrical. Shoaling or breaking waves may produce unequal motion in opposite directions, resulting in asymmetric wave ripples. Ripples formed by a combination of oscillatory wave motion and a unidirectional current may also have asymmetric or more complex profiles.

Wave-formed ripples are most commonly preserved in sediments deposited in shallow marine, lacustrine, and tidal-flat environments. Their presence indicates oscillatory near-bed flow, although ripple shape alone may not be sufficient to reconstruct the depositional environment.

=== Aeolian ripples ===
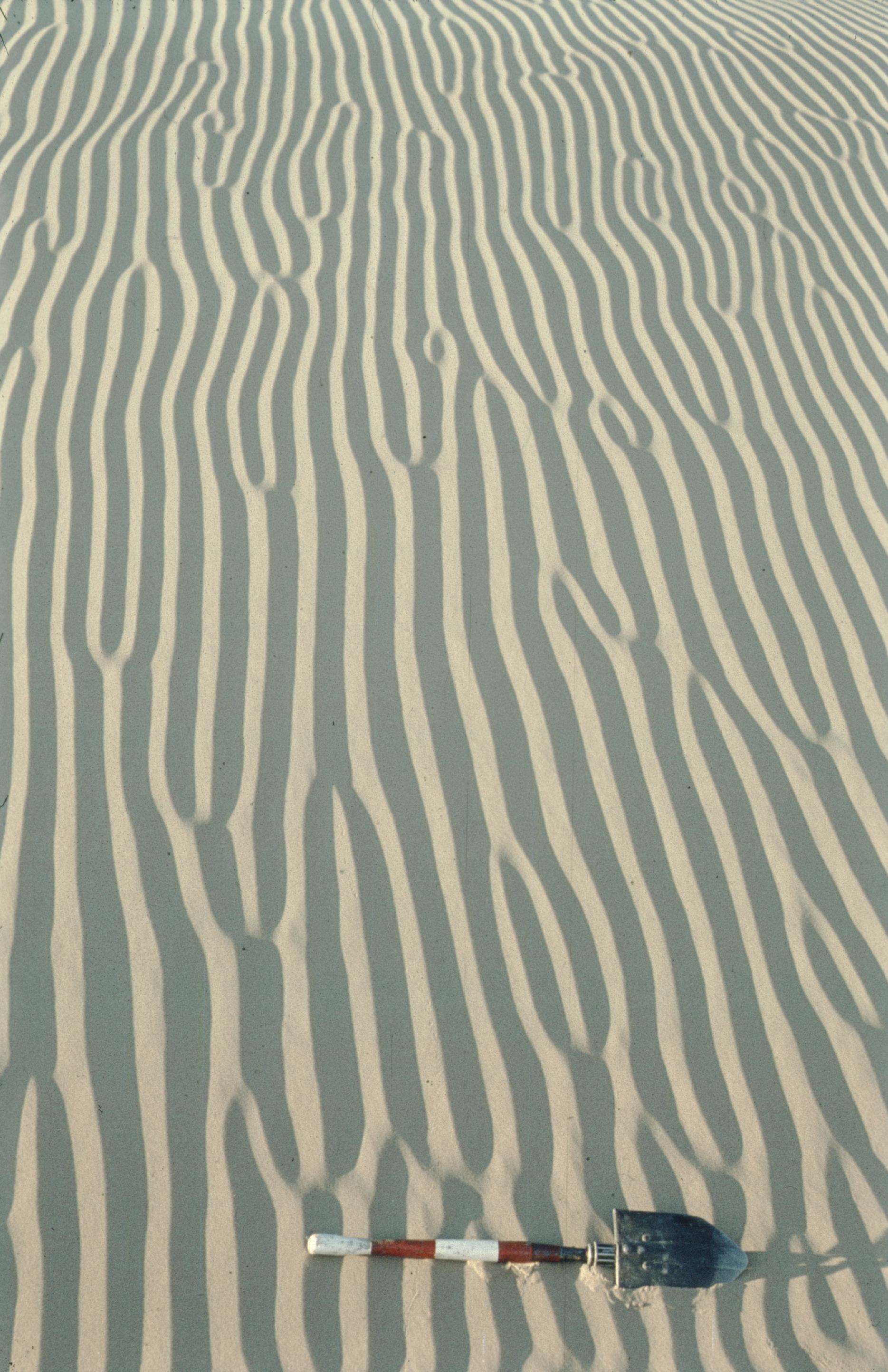
Wind ripples on crescent-shaped sand dunes (Barchans) in Southwest Afghanistan (Sistan).

Aeolian ripples are small bedforms produced when wind transports loose sediment by saltation and surface creep. Their crests lie approximately transverse to the direction of net sediment transport.

Impact ripples
Impact ripples are the most common small aeolian ripples. They develop through interactions between saltating grains and grains resting or moving along the surface. Repeated impacts preferentially move grains from troughs towards crests, causing the ripple pattern to migrate downwind. In sediment containing grains of different sizes, coarser grains may become concentrated near the ripple crests.

Megaripples
Aeolian megaripples are larger bedforms, intermediate in scale between ordinary impact ripples and dunes. On Earth, their wavelengths range from several tens of centimetres to several metres. They typically develop in poorly sorted or bimodal sediment, where saltating finer grains cause coarser grains to move by shorter hops or surface creep. The coarser fraction may form an armoured layer, particularly near the crests.

Fluid drag ripples
Also known as aerodynamic ripples, these are formed with fine, well-sorted grain particles accompanied by high velocity winds which result in long, flat ripples. The flat ripples are formed by long saltation paths taken by grains in suspension and grains on the ground surface.

== Definitions ==
Crest and trough

Crest
The point on a wave with the maximum value or height. It is the location at the peak of the wave cycle as shown in picture to the right.

Trough
The opposite of a crest, so the minimum value or height in a wave. It is the location at the very lowest point of a wave cycle also shown in picture to right.

Lee
The lee side has a steeper slope than the stoss. The lee is always on the back side of the ripple, which is also on the opposite side of where the current flow meets the ripple. The current flows down the lee side.

Stoss
The stoss is the side of a wave or ripple that has a gentle slope versus a steeper slope. Current always flows up the stoss side and down the lee side. This can be used to determine current flow during the time of ripple formation.

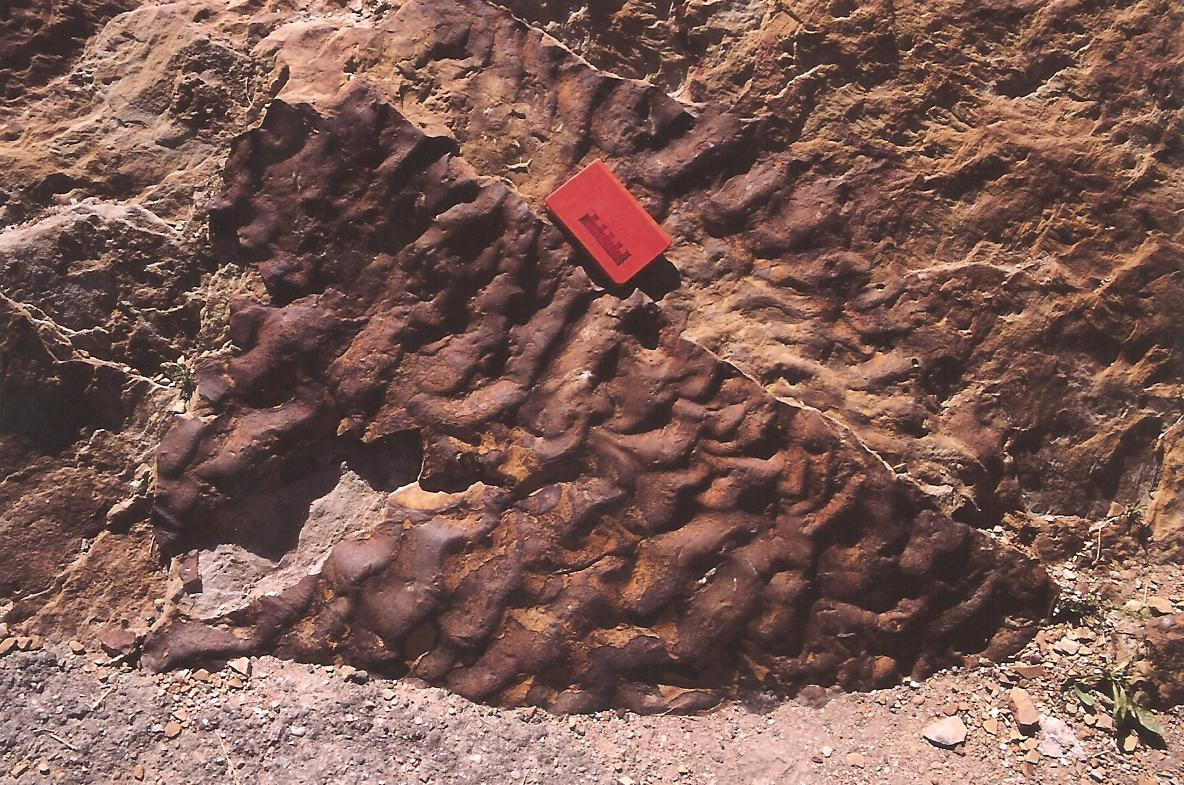
Ripple marks in Cretaceous Dakota Formation, east side of Dinosaur Ridge. Scale bar on notebook is 10 cm.

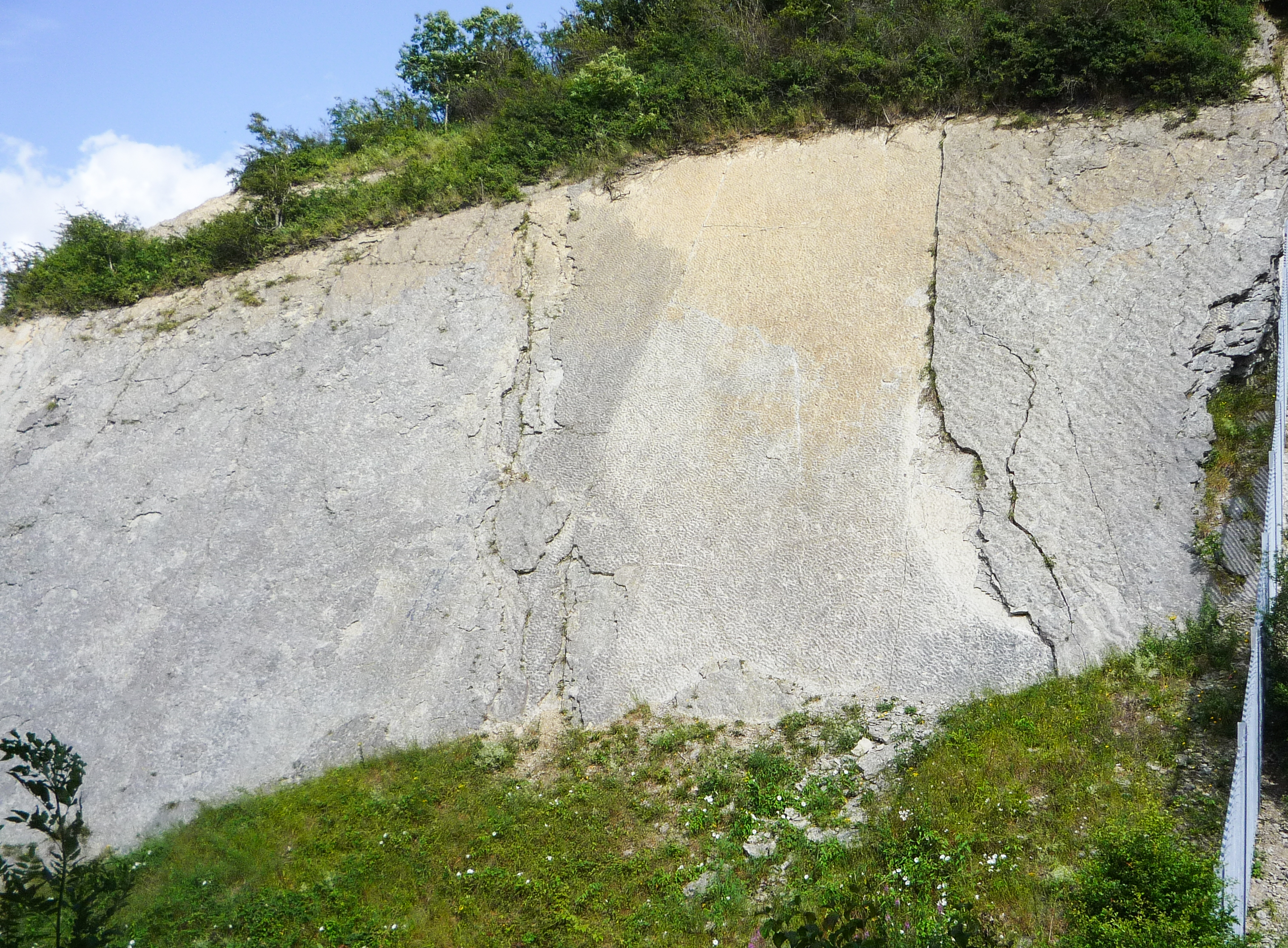
Ripple beds in the Wren's Nest National Nature Reserve, Dudley, England

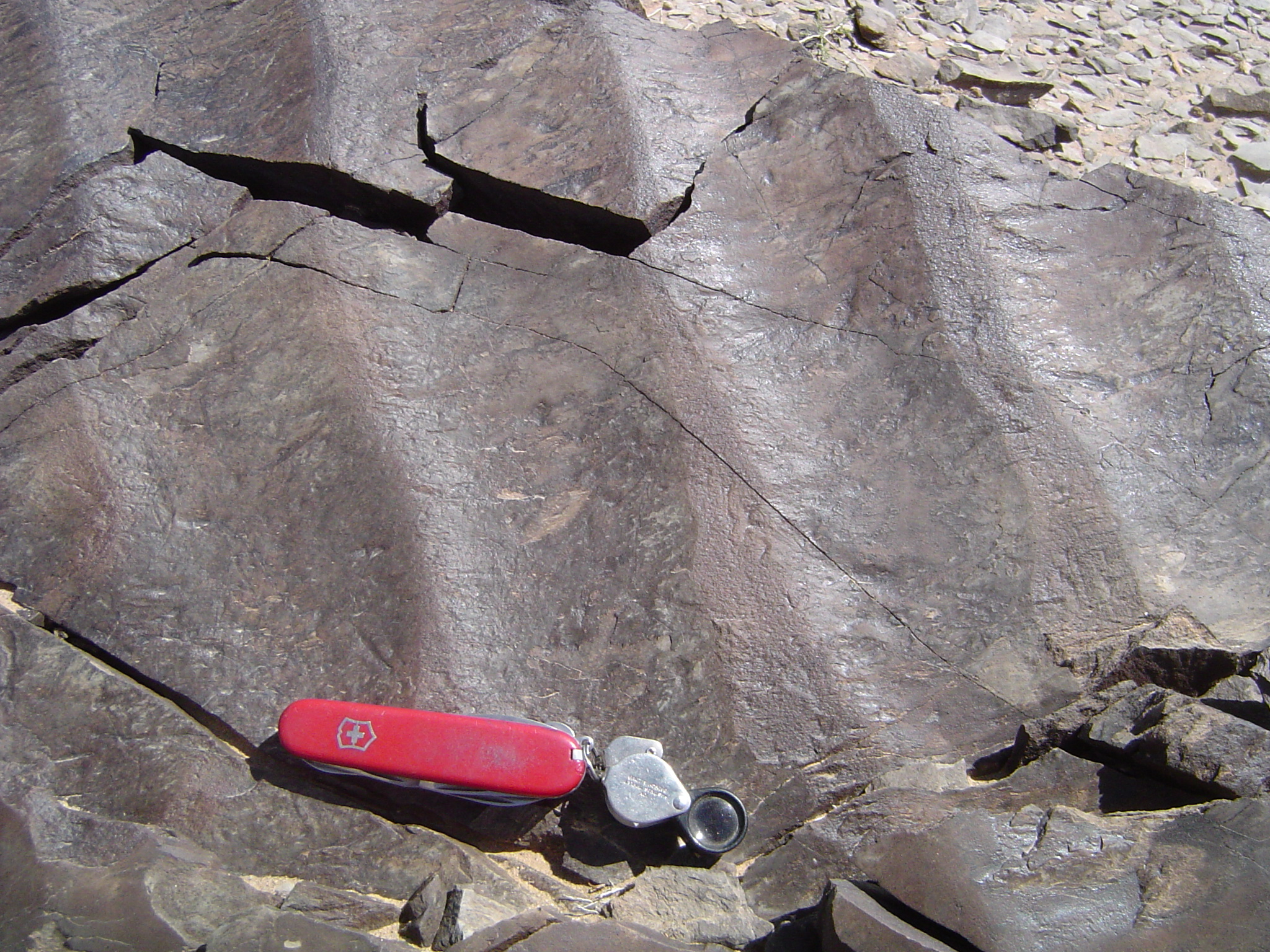
Wave/symmetrical ripple, Nomgon, Mongolia

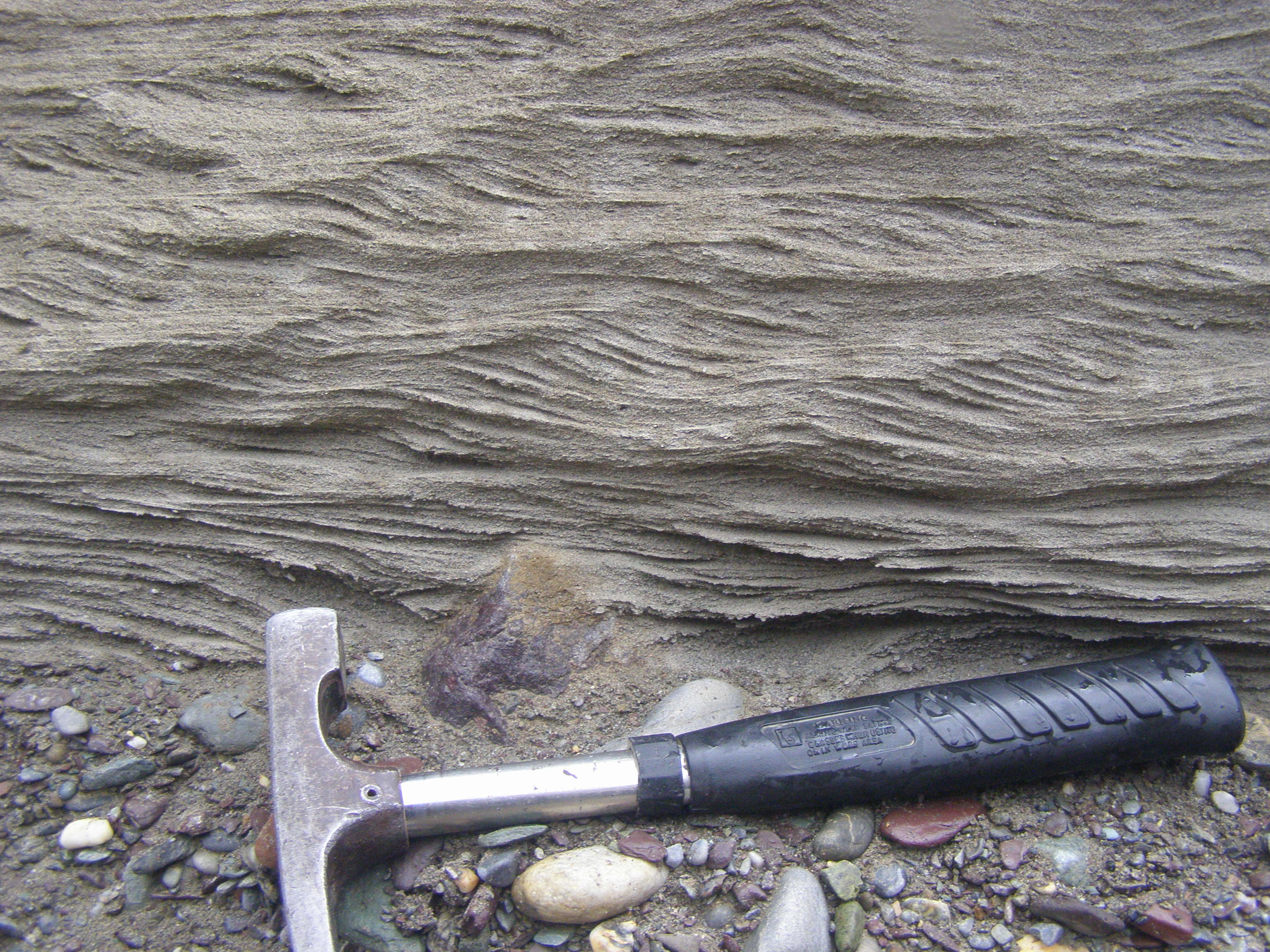
Cross-section through asymmetric climbing ripples, seen in the Zanskar Gorge, Ladakh, NW Indian Himalaya. Ripples climb when sediment fluxes in the flow are very high.

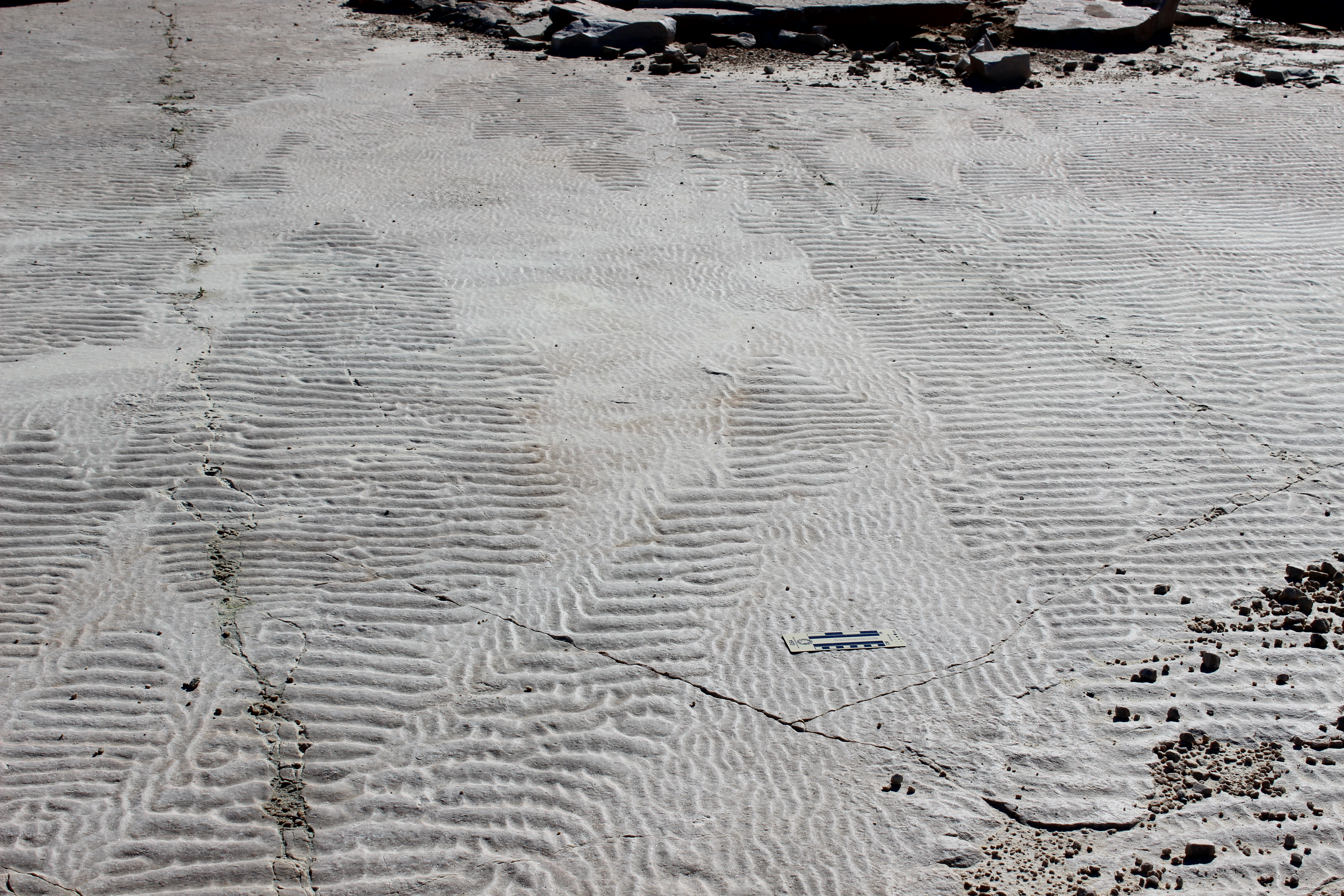
Complex ripple marks on Cambrian tidal flat at Blackberry Hill, Wisconsin.

== See also ==
- Capillary wave
- Giant current ripples
- Hertha Ayrton - pioneer in description of how ripples formed
- Water on Mars - sedimentary ripple marks show indirect evidence of ancient water flows on our neighbor planet
- Transverse aeolian ridges - mysterious fossilized features on Mars that resemble giant ripples
- Washboarding - ripples on dirt roads formed by the interaction of vehicle wheels with the gravel and sediment
