= Gas slug =

Conglomerate of high pressure gas bubbles

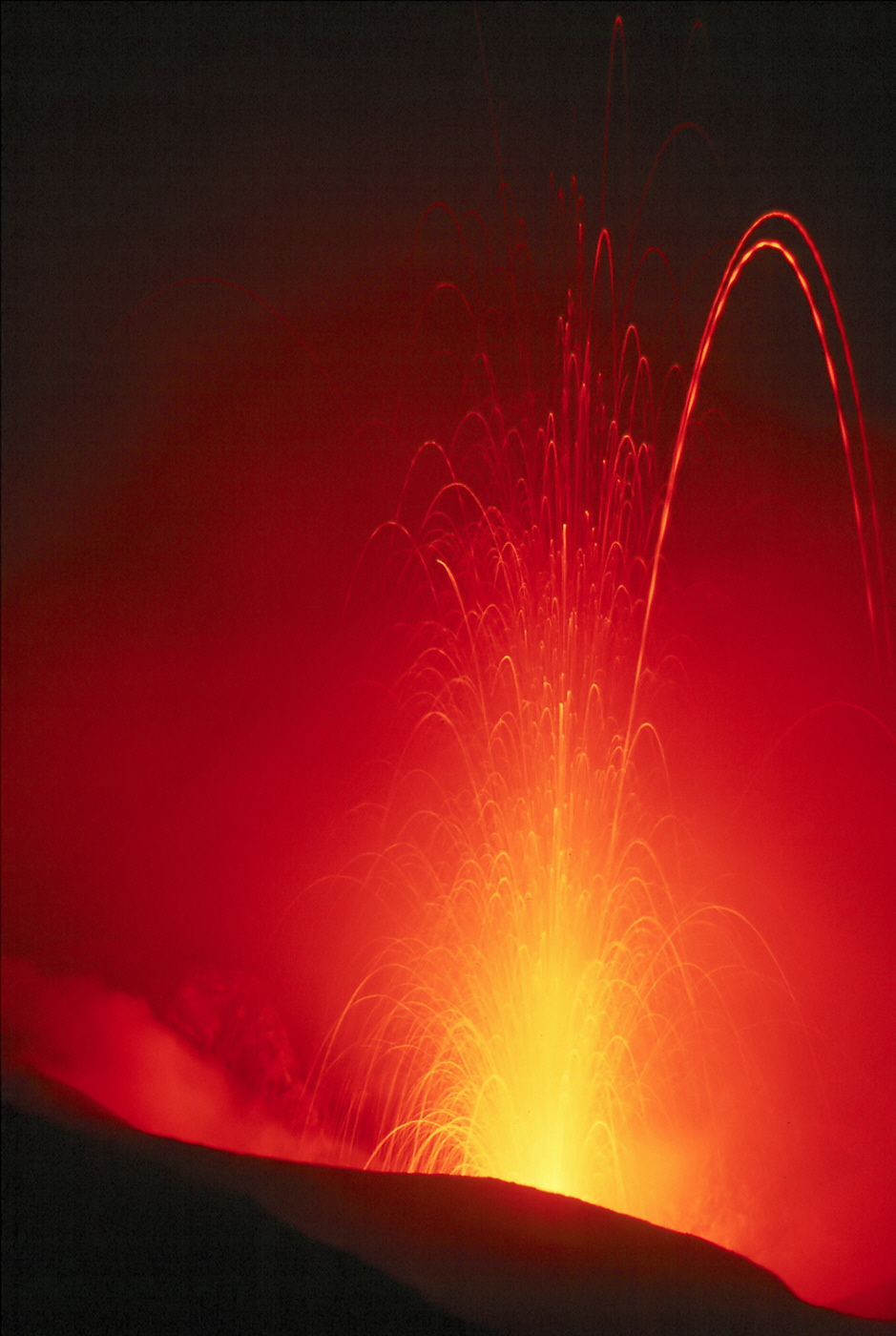
An example of a lava arc driven by gas slugs during Strombolian eruptions.

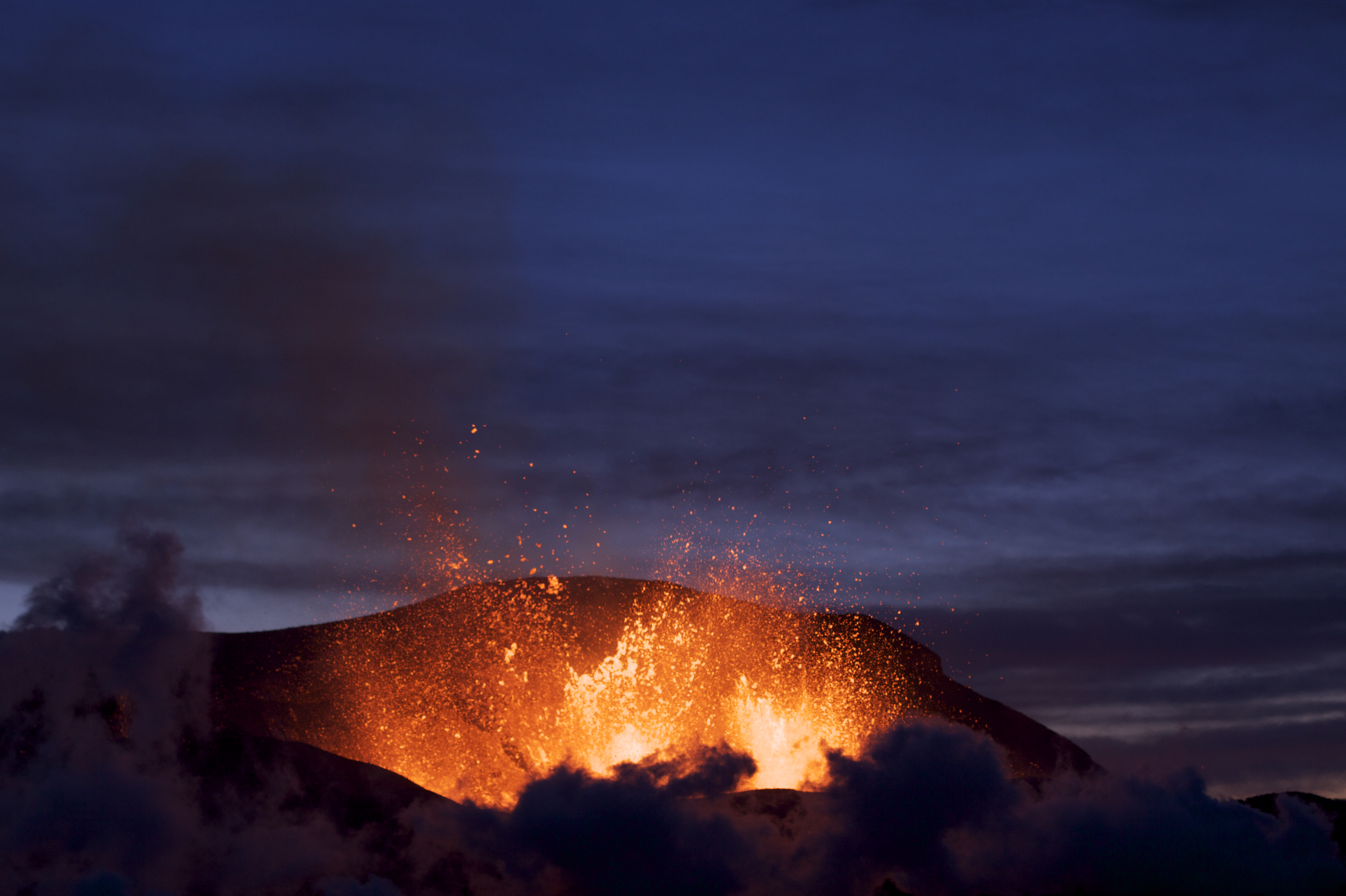
Magma bubbles exerting a volcano during an eruption.

A gas slug is a conglomerate of high pressure gas bubbles that forms within certain volcanoes, the agitation of which is a driving factor in Strombolian eruptions. They start out as small bubbles of gas inside of volcanic magma. These accumulate into one large bubble, which starts to rise through the lava plume. Gas slugs also consist of many chemical properties that assist scientists in monitoring volcanic eruptions.

== Chemistry ==
Volcanic eruptions consist of mostly water vapor gases, with sulfur dioxide and carbon dioxide playing a huge part in gas release as well. Volcanic gases also rely on the composition of magma in the chamber of the volcano and gas separation processes before the point of eruption.

Taylor bubbles, named after G. I. Taylor, refer to elongated gas bubbles in a liquid flow of a system. Taylor bubbles are distinctly "bullet shaped" and are involved in fluid dynamics. Within volcanic activity, magma rises in the volcanic chamber, slowing the movement of gas particles (H_{2}O, SO_{2}, CO_{2}) and allowing for them to separate. As a result, this creates Taylor bubbles, which play a big part in Strombolian eruptions.

== Formation ==
Once the accumulated slug reaches the top of the column and comes in contact with air, it bursts with a loud pop because of the lower air pressure, throwing magma into the air in the typical lava volcanic arc of a Strombolian eruption. This type of eruption is episodic, non-damaging to its source vent, and one of the slowest forms of activity, with the ability to sustain itself for thousands of years. Recent research also suggests that they can form as deep as 3 km (2 mi) under the surface.

== Monitoring/Hazards and Impacts ==
Gas slugs help volcanologists monitor Strombolian eruptions with the help of overpressure stimulation, which occurs when too much pressure grows from the uprising of magmatic material. Seismic and infrasonic signals also contribute to the monitoring of these specific eruptions around the world with the help of gas slugs.

Volcanic activity can pose a threat to the environment and its surroundings, humans, and animals as well. Gas slugs lead to more outbursts of magma and lava from the volcano, leading to pyroclastic flows. These currents from the flows are very dense due to their solid and gaseous properties, allowing them to seep into the environment, harming agriculture and any other living aspects.
