= Maritime impacts of volcanic eruptions =

Satellite view of a pumice raft from an undersea eruption in Tonga

Volcanic eruptions can have various impacts on maritime transportation. When a volcano erupts, large amounts of noxious gases, steam, rock, and ash are released into the atmosphere; fine ash can be transported thousands of miles from the volcano, while high concentrations of coarse particles fall out of the air near the volcano. The high concentrations of hazardous toxic gases are localized in the immediate vicinity of the volcano.

Until more recently public focus has mainly been on effects on aviation effects—ash, which can be undetectable, can cause an aircraft's engine to cut out with catastrophic potential. However, the July 2008 eruption of Okmok Volcano in Alaska triggered attention to the maritime effects. Employees at the National Weather Service Ocean Prediction Center's Ocean Applications Branch examined this event and partnered with the Alaska Volcano Observatory to compile information on the topic.

Ash can affect marine transportation in many ways:

1. Volcanic ash can clog air intake filters in a matter of minutes, crippling airflow to vital machinery. Ash particles are very abrasive and, if they get into an engine's moving parts, can cause severe damage very quickly.
2. Water is the main component in volcanic eruptions; it is what makes them so explosive. Through chemical reactions, toxic gases that are released in eruptions can bond or adsorb to ashfall particles. As the particles land on skin, metal, or other exposed shipboard equipment, they can begin to corrode.
3. Certain types of volcanic ash do not dissolve easily in water. Instead, they clump on the surface of the ocean in pumice rafts. These rafts can clog salt water intake strainers very quickly, which can result in overheating of shipboard machinery dependent on sea water service cooling.
4. Heavy amounts of volcanic ash reduce visibility to less than ½ mi, which is a hazard to navigation. This, combined with the above three other main impacts make sailing in the vicinity of volcanic ash very dangerous for mariners.

== National Weather Service Ashfall Advisories ==
National Weather Service Instruction 10-311 will includes a new text guidance for the offshore and high seas text weather forecasts issued by the Ocean Prediction Center and Tropical Prediction Center's Tropical Analysis and Forecast Branch (TAFB).

== Reported incidents ==
A few cases of ash impact on ships that have been documented are:

The 2008 Eruption of Chaitén Volcano in Chile prompted mass evacuations, in which the Chilean Navy participated. There are reports that the Chilean Navy encountered pumice rafts which were sucked into the salt water service system of the ship's propulsion system. This clogged sea strainers and overheated the engines, almost making the ships unable to escape.

The NOAA Ship Miller Freeman reported light accumulations of volcanic ash during the 2008 Okmok eruption in Dutch Harbor, Alaska. Due to volcanic-ash clogged ventilation systems, the ship remained in port until the event subsided.

In 1891 the Australian steam ship Catterthun reported steaming "for miles through masses of volcanic debris" after an eruption on the island of Sagir in the Indonesian archipelago. It was rumoured that all of the island's 12,000 inhabitants had perished in the eruption.
