= Infrasonic sensing array =

The infrasonic sensing array, designed by the U.S. Army Research Laboratory (ARL), was a military device that detected and located explosive events with inaudible frequencies at long ranges, such as artillery, missiles, and helicopters through the use of the array process. It was also used for direction-finding and positioning for navigational purposes and for detecting atmospheric events for battlefield weather prediction.

== Development and design ==
Infrasound is the area of acoustics that deals with frequencies below the audible region of human hearing. For army infrasound applications, the target frequency range was in the 1–20 Hz band. Infrasound has the ability to reach distances of 100–500 km. There are natural sources of infrasound emissions, such as avalanches, tornados, volcanoes, earthquakes and man-made sources of infrasound, such as aircraft engines, helicopters, artillery, ship engines, bombs, and explosions. Because there were so many different sources of infrasound, methods of detecting were of interest for the military and civilians.

Long distance propagation of infrasound is allowed by ground reflection and molecular attenuation. The ground acts as a reflecting service for incoming energy and molecular attenuation is zero at infrasonic frequencies.

The infrasonic sensing array contained a minimum variance distortion-less response beam former to enhance the detection and estimation performance of the acoustic system by improving the signal to noise ratio. The outputs of a spatially distributed array of sensors were combined by the beam former, where the signals from one direction were added, while the effects of noise and interference from other directions were reduced.

The main obstacle in the detection and analysis of infrasonic signals was the intrinsic pressure fluctuations due to air turbulence/wind noise, which was always present. Wind noise, caused by the passage of air over the microphone, limited the ability to collect infrasonic signature in a covert area. Wind noise levels increased with decreasing frequency and mean noise levels could have been equal or greater than the levels of the signal to be detected. To solve this problem, signal processing, physical wind guards/filters, multiple sensors for spatial averaging, and wind hose/pipe filtering techniques could have been used.

It was shown that wind barriers could be used for wind noise reduction as they break up turbulence and effectively preform spatial average on turbulence scales smaller than the size of the barrier. Microporous hoses stemming from a central microphone were used for applications where the source direction is unknown. These hoses make the filter's instrument response and wind–noise reduction uniform for all signals and wind directions, simplifying the array process.

== Applications ==
Infrasonic sensing arrays supported the U.S. Army's 501st Military Intelligence Brigade in South Korea, fielded in 2001. It was also fielded to Iraq and Afghanistan in 2004. Information obtained with the research of infrasonic sensing arrays lead to the development of The Unattended Transient Acoustic MASINT Sensor (UTAMS) computer carried by the Aerostat of Persistent Threat Detection System (PTDS), which was an acoustic sensor used to detect the point of origin and the point of impact of missiles, IEDs, and missiles.

Other applications included use by military or search and rescue teams, by field researchers studying volcanology or seismology, and by other geo-acoustic scientists and engineers. Infrasound sensing systems were used for the global monitoring of international compliance with weapon test ban treaties. Military use also involved long-range detection and direction-finding of air or ground vehicles, and detecting and locating artillery fire.
