= Connate =

Connate may refer to

- conjoined twins
- connation, in botany
- Connate fluids in geology
