= Overpressure (disambiguation) =

Overpressure is a pressure difference, relative to a normal pressure, in various circumstances:

- In engineering, the pressure difference over the wall thickness of a pressure vessel
- In geology, geologic overpressure, the primary cause of oil gushers
- In autoclave terminology, process pressure above standard given on a pressure/temperature table

== Military science ==
- Overpressure or blast overpressure, the pressure caused by a shock wave over and above normal atmospheric pressure
- Overpressure ammunition, small arms ammunition loaded with a powder charge to produce a greater internal pressure than is standard
- Overpressure (CBRN protection), a method to create a safe toxin free area against airborne contaminants
