= Lithification =

Geologic process

Lithification (from the Ancient Greek word lithos meaning 'rock' and the Latin-derived suffix -ific) is the process in which sediments compact under pressure, expel connate fluids, and gradually become solid rock. Essentially, lithification is a process of porosity destruction through compaction and cementation. Lithification includes all the processes which convert unconsolidated sediments into sedimentary rocks. Petrifaction, though often used as a synonym, is more specifically used to describe the replacement of organic material by silica in the formation of fossils.

== See also ==
- Concretion – In geology, a type of compact mass
- Diagenesis – Physico-chemical changes in sediments occurring after their deposition
- Lithology – Description of the physical characteristics of a rock unit
- Parent rock – Original rock substratum
- Petrifaction – Process of fossilization
- Weathering – Deterioration of rocks and minerals through exposure to the elements
