= Connate fluids =

Liquids that were trapped in the pores of sedimentary rocks

In geology and sedimentology, connate fluids are liquids that were trapped in the pores of sedimentary rocks as they were deposited. These liquids are largely composed of water, but also contain many mineral components as ions in solution.

As rocks are buried, they undergo lithification and the connate fluids are usually expelled. If the escape route for these fluids is blocked, the pore fluid pressure can build up, leading to overpressure.

== Formation and diagenetic evolution ==
Connate fluids form when water is trapped in sediments during deposition. When sediments are buried the temperature increases and so does the pressure. This will cause chemical changes through interactions with nearby minerals. This processes is known as diagenesis and it alters the composition of fluids over time which will can increase their salinity.

Connate fluids can stay trapped in low-permeability rocks and if they stay buried, can lead to increased pressure within pore spaces. Sometimes this will contribute to overpressure conditions in sedimentary basins. This is important in drilling and reservoir management. As burial continues, some connate fluids could stay trapped in low-permeability rocks. However, others may migrate through the formation. In deeper basins, physical and chemical properties of these fluids can be altered by increasing pressure and temperature.

== Significance ==
An understanding of the geochemistry of connate fluids is important if the diagenesis of the rock is to be quantified. The solutes in the connate fluids often precipitate and reduce the porosity and permeability of the host rock, which can have important implications for its hydrocarbon prospectivity. The chemical components of the connate fluid can also yield information on the provenance of aquifers and of the thermal history of the host rock. Minute bubbles of fluid are often trapped within the crystals of the cementing material. These fluid inclusions provide direct information about the composition of the fluid and the pressure-temperature conditions that existed during diagenesis of the sediments.

Some analyses of connate water samples from Louisiana (USA) compared to seawater

		Average of samples from Tertiary formations		Average of samples from Cretaceous formations	
Constituent	Seawater mg/l	Connate water mg/l	Ratio Connate/Sea Water	Connate water mg/l	Ratio Connate/Sea Water
Lithium	0.2	3	15	4	20
Sodium	10,600	37,539	3.5	28,462	2.7
Potassium	380	226	0.59	193	0.51
Calcium	400	2,077	5.2	4,999	12
Magnesium	1,300	686	0.53	606	0.47
Strontium	8	148	19	346	43
Barium	0.03	73	2,430	48.3	1,608
Boron	4.8	20	4.1	27.5	5.7
Chloride	19,000	63,992	3.4	54,910	2.9
Bromide	65	79	1.2	287	4.4
Iodide	0.05	21	420	37	740
Sulphate	2,690	104	0.039	206	0.077
Source: A. Gene Collins, "Geochemistry of some petroleum-associated waters from Louisiana," US Bureau of Mines, Rept. of Investigations 7326, January 1970.

Similar, but different in origin, is the concept of fossil water, which is used to describe very old groundwater found in deep aquifers or bedrock. Typically it was recharged during a different climatic period (e.g., the last ice age) so is also very old, but possibly not of the same genesis as the rock.

== Geochemical characteristics ==
Compared to modern seawater, connate fluids are typically higher in saline. They often contain dissolved ions like sodium, calcium, and chloride. However, these change over time due to interactions with surrounding rocks. With these changes of composition, they can influence the physical properties of reservoir rock including fluid behavior.

== Significance in petroleum engineering ==
Connate fluids play a key role in oil and gas reservoirs by affecting how fluids move through rock. The presence of connate water can reduce oil recovery by restricting the flow of hydrocarbons. This is important in petroleum engineering because fluid saturation and rock properties impact production efficiency.

== Comparison with other subsurface fluids ==
Connate fluids are different from other subsurface fluids because of their origin. Unlike meteoric water that comes from precipitation and goes into the ground from the surface, connate fluids are trapped in those sediments during deposition. Magmatic fluids are formed during mineral changes under heat and pressure. These are important distinctions to know for understanding fluid behavior in geological environments.

== See also ==
- Petroleum geology
