= Geologic overpressure =

Petroleum geology

Geologic overpressure in stratigraphic layers is caused by the inability of connate pore fluids to escape as the surrounding mineral matrix compacts under the lithostatic pressure caused by overlying layers. Fluid escape may be impeded by sealing of the compacting rock by surrounding impermeable layers (such as evaporites, chalk and cemented sandstones). Alternatively, the rate of burial of the stratigraphic layer may be so great that the efflux of fluid is not sufficiently rapid to maintain hydrostatic pressure.

Common situations where overpressure may occur include sedimentary layers that are rapidly buried or confined by low-permeability units, such as shales or compacted clays, which impede the escape of pore fluids. Identifying and diagnosing overpressured zones is critical during drilling, because the drilling mud density must be carefully adjusted to balance the formation pressure. Failure to do so can result in uncontrolled fluid influx or blowouts at the wellhead, with potentially serious safety and environmental consequences.

Because overpressured sediments tend to exhibit better porosity than would be predicted from their depth, they often make attractive hydrocarbon reservoirs and are therefore of important economic interest.
