= Micrite =

Limestone formed of calcareous particles

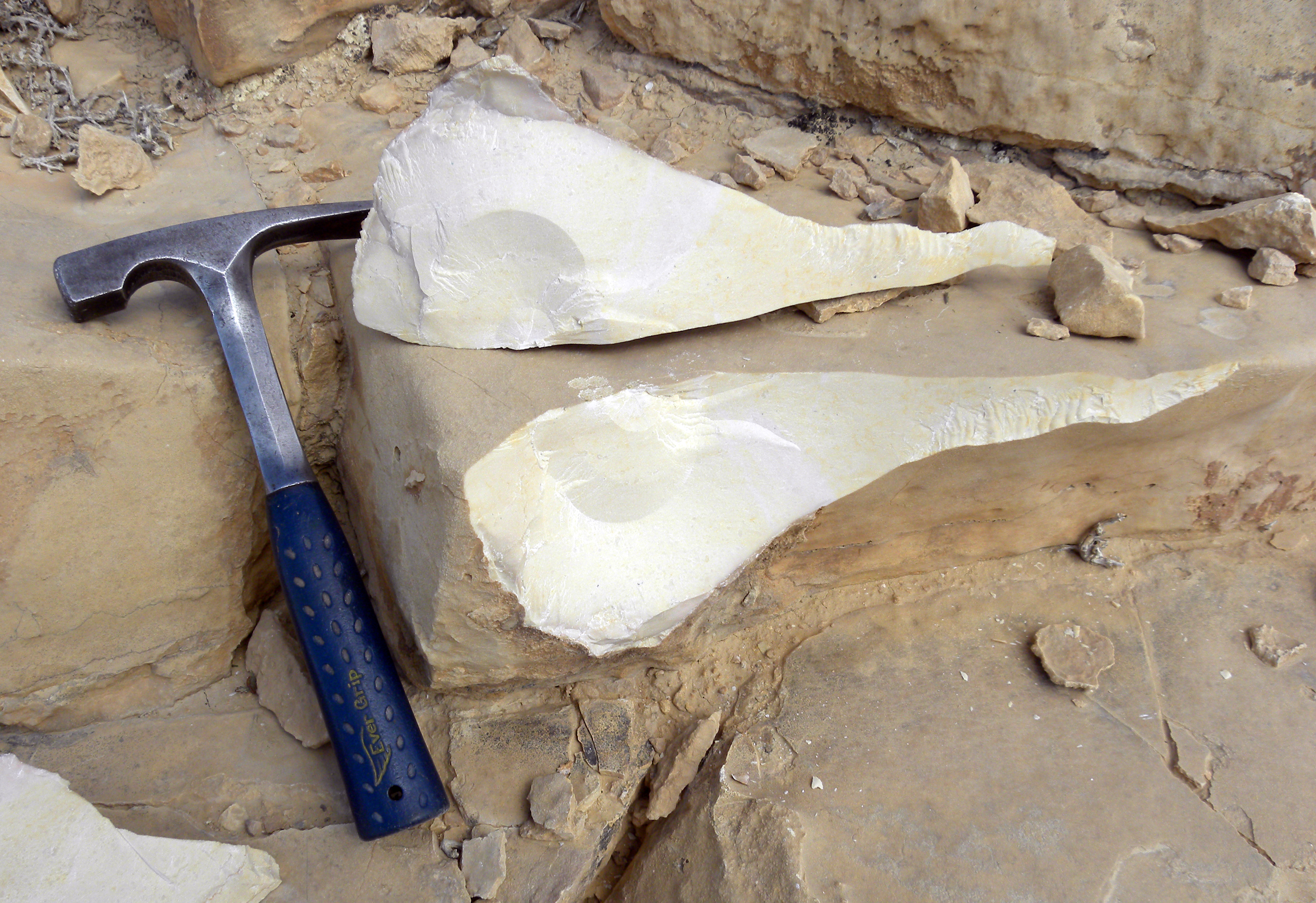
Meleke in the Gerofit Formation (Turonian) near Makhtesh Ramon, southern Israel; a type of micrite.

Micrite is a limestone constituent formed of fine calcareous particles ranging in diameter up to five μm formed by the recrystallization of lime mud.

The term was coined in 1959 by sedimentary petrologist Robert L. Folk as part of his carbonate rock classification system. Micrite is derived from MICRocrystalline calcITE. In the Folk classification micrite is a carbonate rock dominated by fine-grained calcite. Carbonate rocks that contain fine-grained calcite in addition to allochems are named intramicrite, oomicrite, biomicrite or pelmicrite under the Folk classification depending on the dominant allochem.

Micrite is lime mud, carbonate of mud grade. Micrite, as a component of carbonate rocks, can occur as a matrix, as micrite envelopes around allochems, or as peloids. The origin of micrites remains a problem in carbonate sedimentology because the processes that generate them are not unique. Micrite can be generated through multiple processes. In lakes and some marine environments, lime mud that could become micrite can form chemically or biochemically through whiting events, whereas in warm, stratified marine waters, it may form chemically. Alternatively, microbial process known as micritization may lead to micrite formation. Other processes which might produce micrite include the disaggregation of peloids, bioerosion, the mechanical degradation of larger carbonate grains and dissolution-reprecipitation processes.
