= QFL diagram =

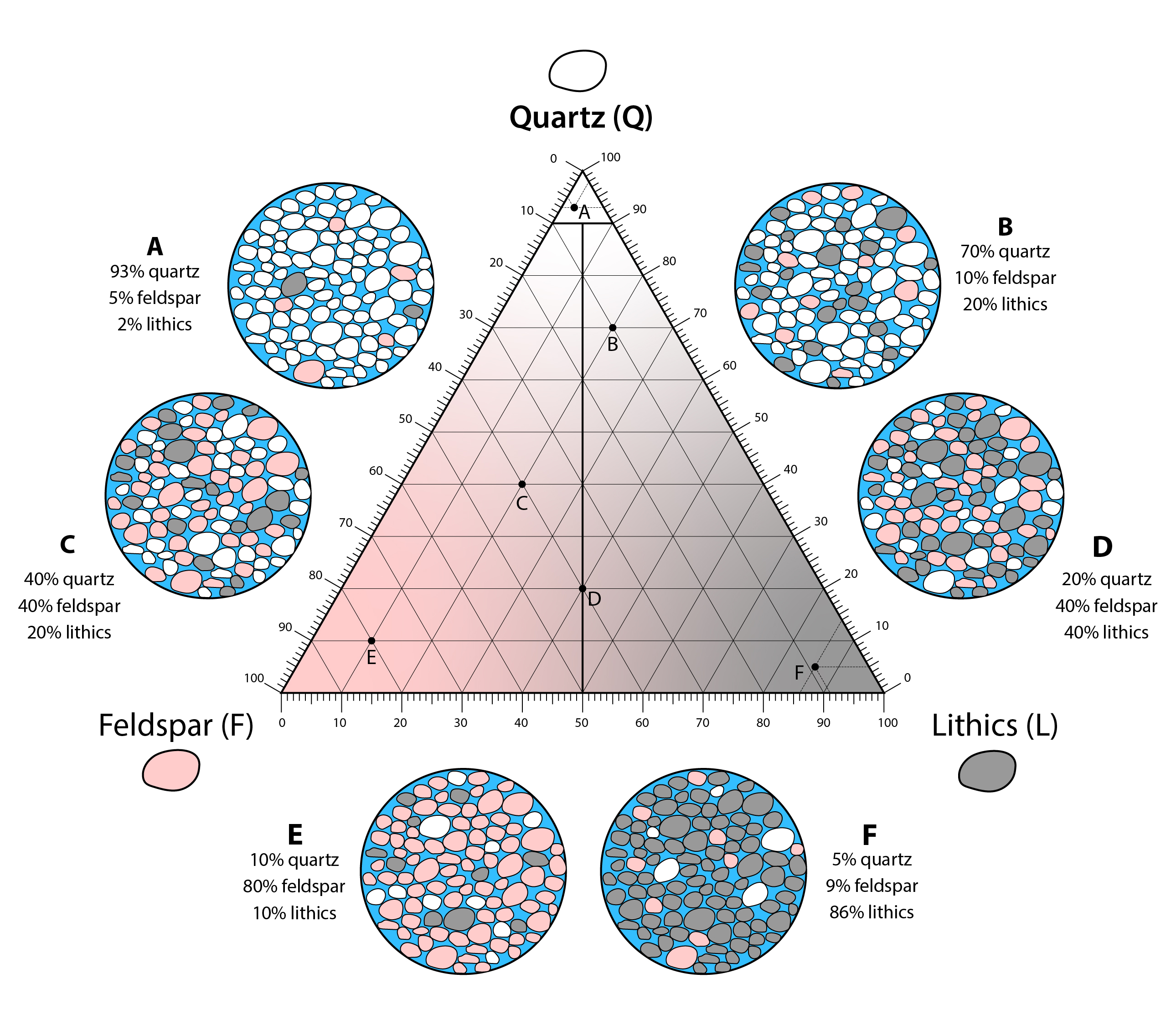
Ternary diagram showing the relative abundance of quartz, feldspar, and lithic grains and views of what selected compositions would look like.

A QFL diagram or QFL triangle is a type of ternary diagram that shows compositional data from sandstones and modern sands, point counted using the Gazzi-Dickinson method. The abbreviations used are as follows:

- Q – quartz
- F – feldspar
- L – lithic fragments

In general, the most contentious item counted is chert, which is usually counted as a lithic fragment, but is sometimes better suited in the Q pole. When this happens, the pole is renamed 'Qt' instead of Q.

QFL triangle showing schematic plots of common sand compositions

The importance of a QFL triangle is mainly demonstrated in tectonic exercises. As first demonstrated in the 1979 paper by Bill Dickinson and Chris Suczek, the composition and provenance of a sandstone is directly related to its tectonic environment of formation.

- Craton sands are clustered near the Q pole. As sandstones, these are known as quartz arenites.
- Transitional continental sands are along the QF line. As sandstones, these are known as arkoses.
- Basement uplift sands are near the F pole. This includes "thick-skinned tectonics." As sandstones, these are known as arkoses.
- Recycled orogen sands plot near the Q pole, but with significant F and L components. This includes "thin-skinned tectonics" common in subduction back-arc thrusting. As sandstones, these are known as lithic sandstones.
- Arc sands plot along the F and L line, with sometimes significant Q components. Clustering near the F pole indicates a dissected arc, and clustering near the L pole indicates an undissected, or new arc. As sandstones, these are known as arkoses and/or lithic sandstones.

== See also ==
- Folk classification
