= Allochem =

Identifiable grains in carbonate rocks

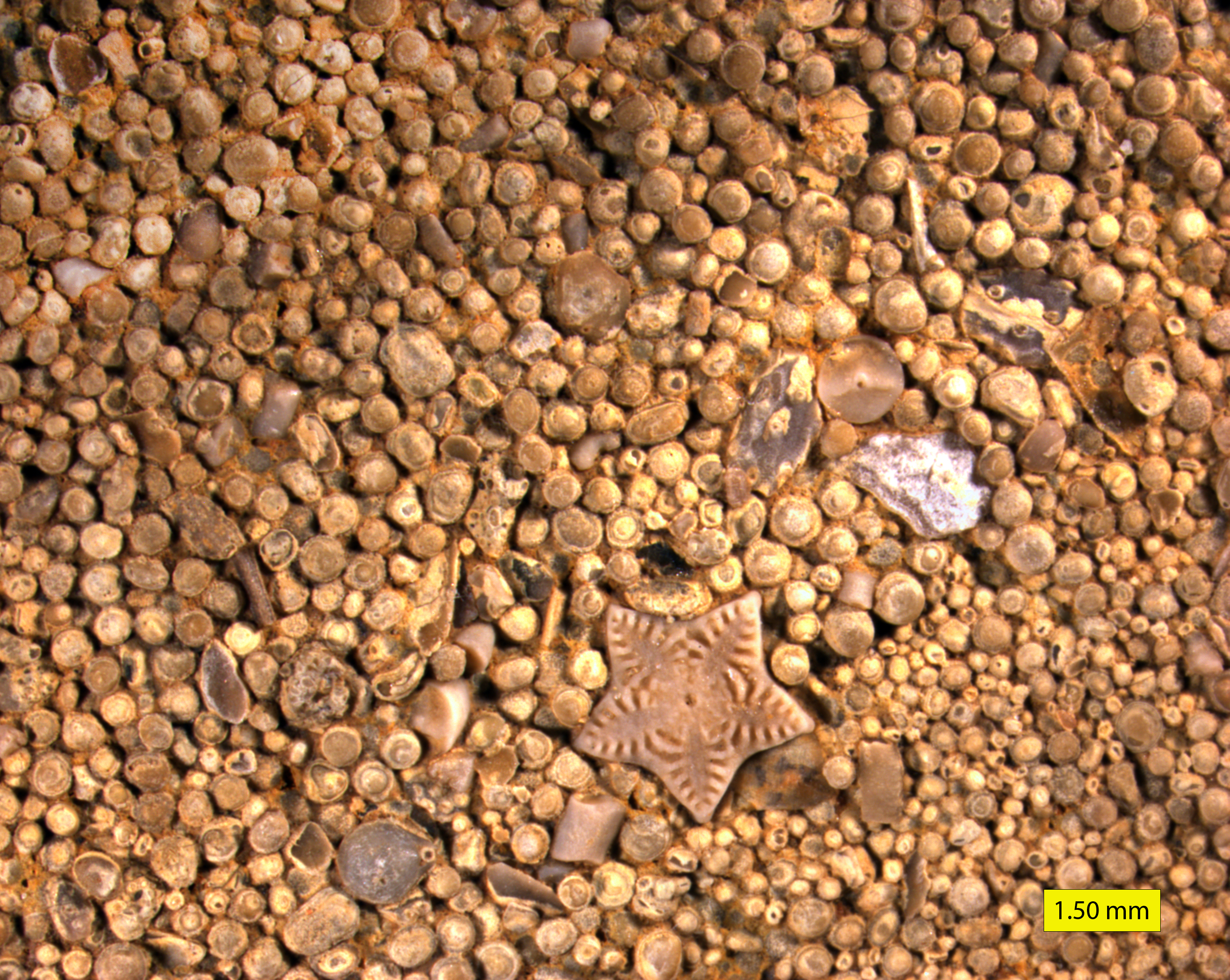
Ooids on the surface of a limestone; Carmel Formation (Middle Jurassic) of southern Utah, USA. Largest is 1.0 mm in diameter.

The term Allochem was introduced by sedimentary petrologist Robert L. Folk as part of his petrographic classification of limestones to describe the recognizable "grains" in carbonate rocks. Examples would include ooids, peloids, oncolites, pellets, fossil or pre-existing carbonate fragments. Fragments are still termed allochems if they have undergone chemical transformations – for example, if an aragonite shell were to dissolve and be later replaced by calcite, the replacement would still be deemed an allochem.

The allochems are typically embedded in a matrix of micrite (< 5 μm in lime mud) or sparry calcite (larger calcite crystals in the size range 20–100 μm).
