= Point counting =

Point counting may refer to

- A method to determine the proportion of components within a thin section, see Point counting (geology)
- A problem in the theory of elliptic curves, see Counting points on elliptic curves
- An evaluation system in bridge, see Hand evaluation
- A method of estimating bird population; see Avian ecology field methods#Point counts and area searches
