= Color index (geology) =

Ratio of dark- to light-colored minerals in a rock

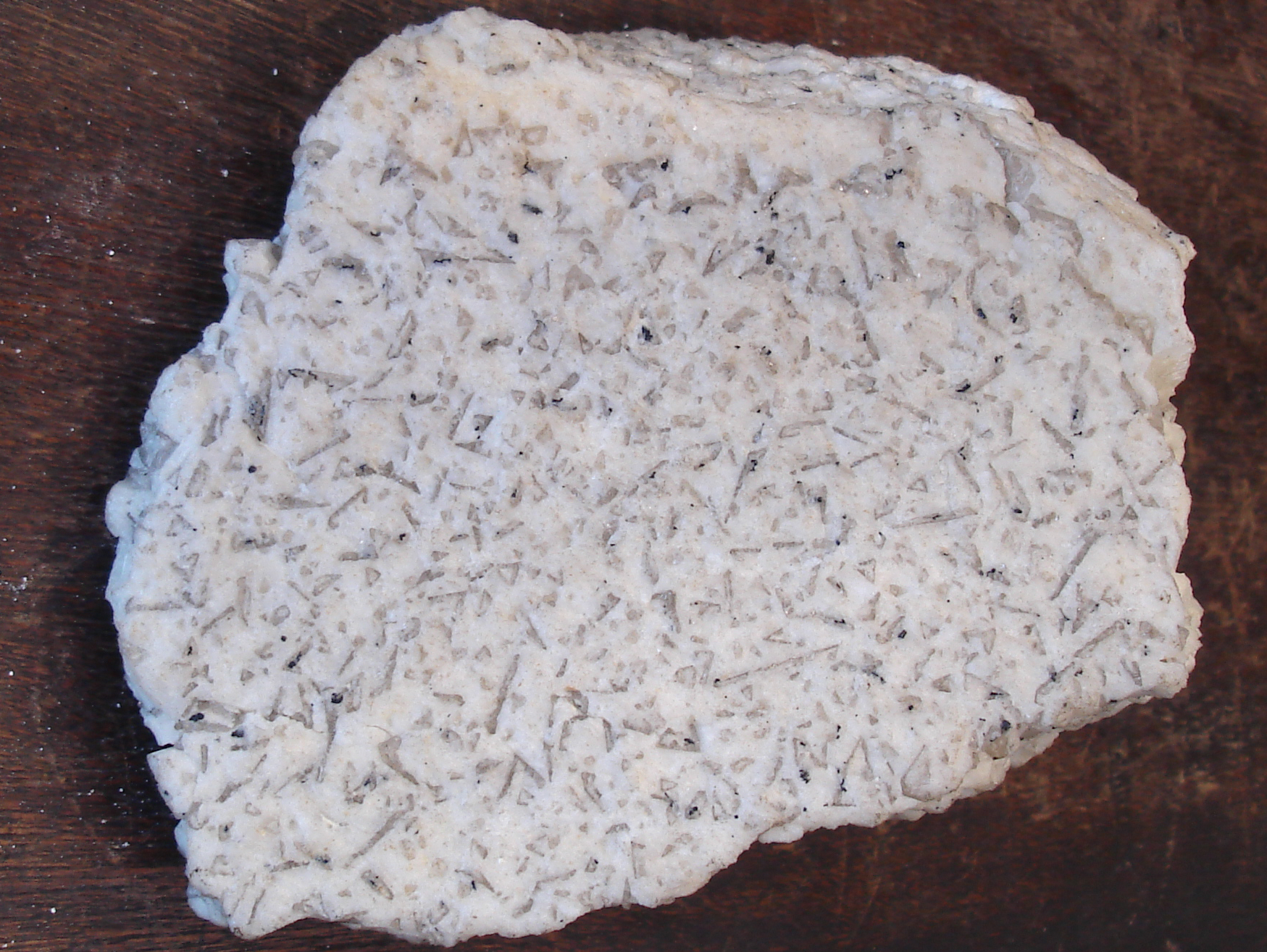
a light-colored leucocratic igneous rock

a dark-colored melanocratic igneous rock

Color index, as a geological term, is a measure of the ratio between generally dark mafic minerals and generally light felsic minerals in an igneous rock. The color index of an igneous rock is the volume percentage of mafic minerals in the rock, excluding minerals generally regarded as "colorless" such as apatite, muscovite, primary carbonates and similar minerals. Rocks can be sorted into classes by several systems based on their color index, including into leucocratic and melanocratic rocks, or into (mineralogically) felsic and mafic rocks.

With an accuracy within 1%, color index can be determined by applying a microscope to a flat, planar section of rock and employing a point counting technique to determine the amount of light or dark rock. In the field, it can be generally estimated visually from hand specimens.

The most common light-colored (felsic) minerals are the feldspars, feldspathoids, and silica or quartz. Common dark-colored (mafic) minerals include olivine, pyroxene, amphibole, biotite, tourmaline, iron oxides, sulfides, and metals. In their pure form, felsic minerals have a color index of 0, and mafic minerals have a color index of 100, due to being composed entirely of themselves.

== Classifications ==
=== Melanocratic and leucocratic rocks ===
Based on their color index, rocks can be classified as melanocratic (higher color index), leucocratic (lower color index), or mesocratic (middle color index), as well as hololeucocratic and holomelanocratic (extremes to either side). For example, leucocratic granite would be brighter and have a lower color index than regular granite. The exact percentages separating the classes vary between petrologists.

According to Comenius University in Bratislava's Atlas of Magmatic Rocks, color indices 0–10 are hololeucocratic, 10–35 are leucocratic, 35–65 are mesocratic, 65–90 are melanocratic, and 90–100 are holomelanocratic. According to the Encyclopedia of Igneous and Metamorphic Petrology (1989), and the American Geological Institute Glossary of Geology and Related Sciences (1957), color indices 0–30 are leucocratic, 30–60 are mesocratic, and 60–100 are melanocratic. The Oxford Dictionary of Earth Sciences (2013, 4th ed.) gives a third definition in which color indices 0–5 are hololeucocratic, 5–30 are leucocratic, 30–60 are mesocratic, and 60–90 are melanocratic, not defining holomelanocratic. Some of these definitions are listed below:

Example divisions of the terms
Term	Atlas of Magmatic Rocks	American Geological Institute 1957, Encyclopedia of Igneous and Metamorphic Petrology 1989	Oxford Dictionary of Earth Sciences 2013
Hololeucocratic	0–10	N/A	0–5
Leucocratic	10–35	0–30	5–30
Mesocratic	35–65	30–60	30–60
Melanocratic	65–90	60–100	60–90
Holomelanocratic	90–100	N/A	???

=== Felsic and mafic rocks ===
Another classification of color index is into (mineralogically) felsic and mafic rocks. Rocks with low color indices are felsic, and those with higher color indices are mafic, although the exact thresholds used vary. This terminology conflicts with the definition of felsic and mafic rocks based on silica content. For example, a rock composed entirely of pyroxene would contain about 50% silica. Its silica content (by one common classification) would make it a mafic rock in chemical terms, but an ultramafic rock in mineralogical terms, because it would be entirely composed of a mafic mineral. Some examples of felsic rocks include granite and rhyolite, while examples of mafic rocks include gabbro and basalt.

According to the Encyclopædia Britannica, color indices, 0–50 are felsic, 50–90 are mafic, and 90–100 are ultramafic. An online geology textbook provides an example of the use of another classification scheme, in which color indices 0–15 are felsic, 15–45 are intermediate, 45–85 are mafic, and 85–100 are ultramafic.

Example divisions of the terms
Term	Britannica	Geology textbook
Felsic	0–50	0–15
Intermediate	N/A	15–45
Mafic	50–90	45–85
Ultramafic	90–100	85–100

== Characteristics ==
Speaking broadly, mineral color points out the specific gravity of the mineral, as minerals that are lighter in color tend to be less dense. Darker minerals typically tend to contain more of relatively heavy elements, notably iron, magnesium, and calcium.

The temperature of crystallization affects what the color index of rocks tends to be.

== External links and references ==
- britannica.com reference
- Another link
