= Folk classification =

Sedimentary rock classification

The Folk classification, in geology, is a technical descriptive classification of sedimentary rocks devised by Robert L. Folk, an influential sedimentary petrologist and Professor Emeritus at the University of Texas.

== Folk's sandstone (clastic) classification ==
Folk's philosophy is that the name of a rock must convey as much information as possible without being a complete description. For this, he proposed five important properties of sandstones to use as defining characteristics. These five properties are: grain size, chemically precipitated cements, textural maturity, miscellaneous transported constituents, and clan designation. Folk's fivefold name must be in the following format:

(Grain size): (chemically precipitated cements) (textural maturity) (miscellaneous transported constituents) (clan designation)

However, Folk stated that cements and miscellaneous transported constituents are optional categories as they are not always observed. The other three properties should always be mentioned.

The following are examples of rock names using Folk's fivefold name:

Coarse sandstone: calcitic submature micaceous subarkose
Fine sandstone: supermature quartzarenite
Sandy granule conglomerate: calcitic submature calclithite
Very fine sandstone: chert-cemented submature quartzose phyllarenite
Clayey very fine sandstone: immature fossiliferous plagioclase arkose

=== Clan designation ===
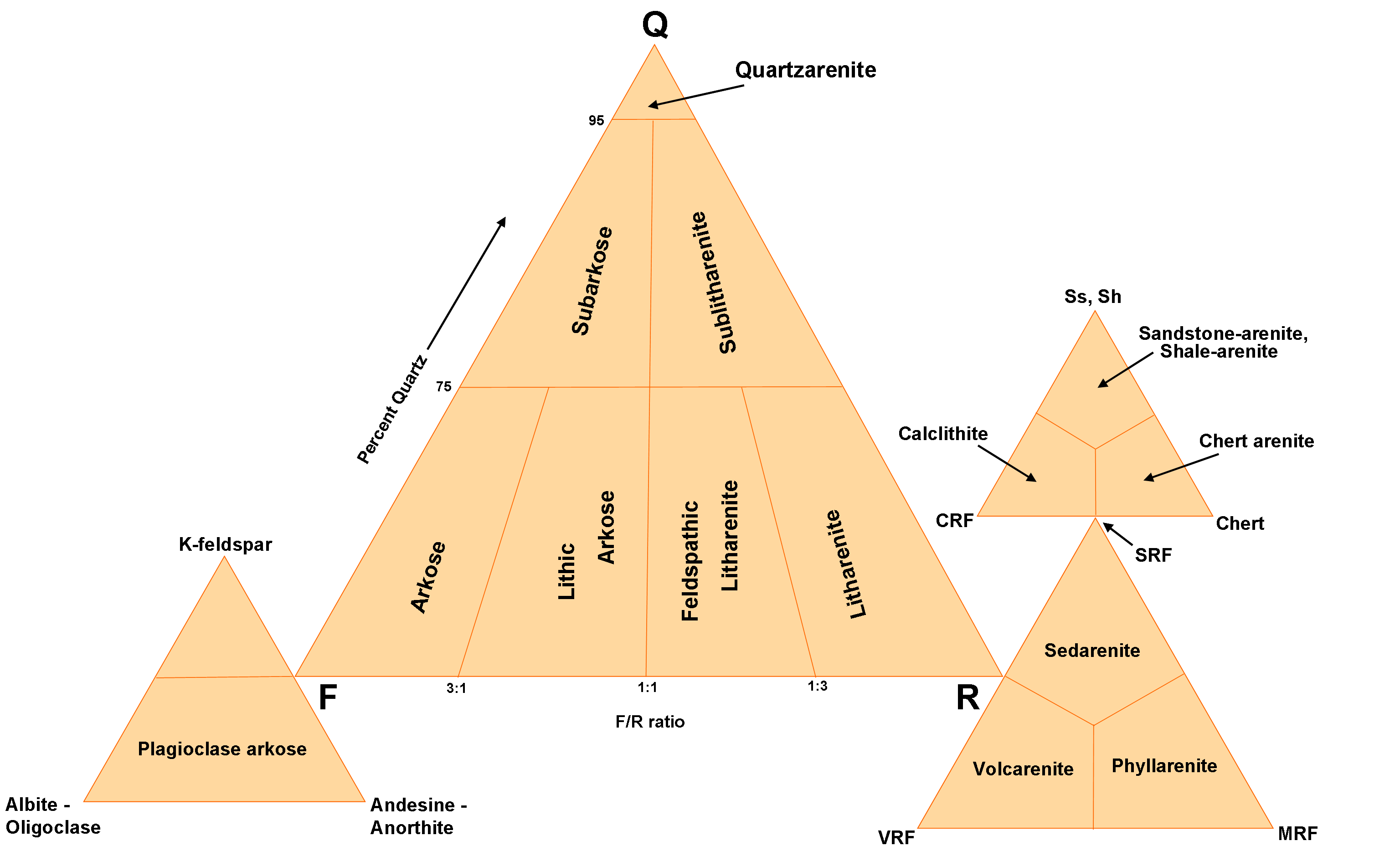
QFR diagram for Folk's sandstone classification

As others before him, Folk proposed a classification for sandstones based on the relative abundances of quartz (Q), feldspars (F), and rock fragments (R). These are the main poles of the classification diagram.

To define the clan name one must normalize the sum of abundances of quartz, feldspars and rock fragments to 100%. This means that other constituents that don't fit in these categories are disregarded. After this, the relative percentages of quartz, feldspars and rock fragments are used to plot the appropriate point on a QFR triangle and obtain the clan designation.

There are some exceptions when summing the abundances. Due to the difficulty in distinguishing quartz from metaquartzite rock fragments, metaquartzite is always plotted on the Q pole of the QFR diagram along with quartz. Granites and other phaneritic igneous rock fragments are plotted in the F pole of the diagram.

If the abundances of quartz, feldspars and rock fragments indicate that the rock is an arkose, a subarkose or a lithic arkose, one must then normalize the abundance of feldspars to 100% and attempt to identify the relative abundances of K-feldspars to plagioclase in the sample. If there is more plagioclase than there is K-feldspar, the rock is either a plagioclase arkose, a plagioclase subarkose or a lithic plagioclase arkose, respectively. If there is more K-feldspar than there is plagioclase, or if it is too difficult to make a distinction between the feldspars, the name stays as arkose, subarkose or lithic arkose, respectively.

If the abundances of quartz, feldspars and rock fragments indicate that the rock is a litharenite, a sublitharenite or a feldspathic litharenite, one must then normalize the abundance of rock fragments to 100% and attempt to identify the relative abundances of volcanic rock fragments (VRFs), metamorphic rock fragments (MRFs) and sedimentary rock fragments (SRFs). If the relative abundances cannot be identified, then the clan name is simply obtained from the QFR triangle. If the relative abundances can be obtained, one must plot the appropriate point in the VRF-MRF-SRF triangle to obtain the clan name. If the point plots in the sedarenite field, one must then normalize all the sedimentary rock fragments to 100% and attempt to find the relative abundances of carbonate rock fragments (CRFs), chert fragments and sandstone fragments (Ss) and shale fragments (Sh). Using this information one must plot the point in the CRF-chert-Ss, Sh triangle and find the appropriate clan name. If the relative abundances of different sedimentary rock fragments cannot be obtained, then the rock is called a sedarenite, subsedarenite or feldspathic sedarenite, respectively.

The name must be as specific as possible and one must try to avoid using broad terms like litharenite or sedarenite if the necessary information is available.

=== Miscellaneous transported constituents ===
Miscellaneous transported constituents are any grains that do not fall into the categories described by the QFR diagram. These usually include heavy minerals or fossil fragments. These constituents provide a signature for the observed formation and will help correlating between various samples.

=== Textural maturity ===
Textural maturity is a property that relates to the amount of mechanical energy input on transported sediments through the abrasive power of currents and tides. It is observed in certain characteristics such as rounding and sorting of the grains. Folk states that as more mechanical energy is applied to transported sediment, this sediment will pass through the following four stages sequentially:

Immature stage: The sediment contains more than 5% clay and sand grains are poorly sorted and angular.
Submature stage: The sediment contains less than 5% clay and sand grains are poorly sorted and subangular to subrounded.
Mature stage: The sediment contains little to no clay and sand grains are well sorted but not well rounded.
Supermature stage: Sediment contains no clay and sand grains are well sorted and well rounded.

=== Cements ===
Cements are authigenic minerals precipitated in the pores of clastic rocks. The composition and texture of these cements depends on the chemistry of the water in the pore, the surrounding mineralogy, and the temperature and pressure conditions during cementation.

=== Grain size name ===
Grain size refers to the diameter of the largest possible inscribed circle in a grain. In Folk's classification scheme, one uses the Wentworth scale to find the appropriate grain size name.

== Folk's carbonate classification ==
Folk's carbonate rock classification details the relative proportions of allochems in the rock and the type of matrix. The classification scheme covers most common carbonate rocks, however the more inclusive although less precise alternative, Dunham classification, may be preferred in some instances. Folk classification consists of one or two prefixes followed by a suffix.

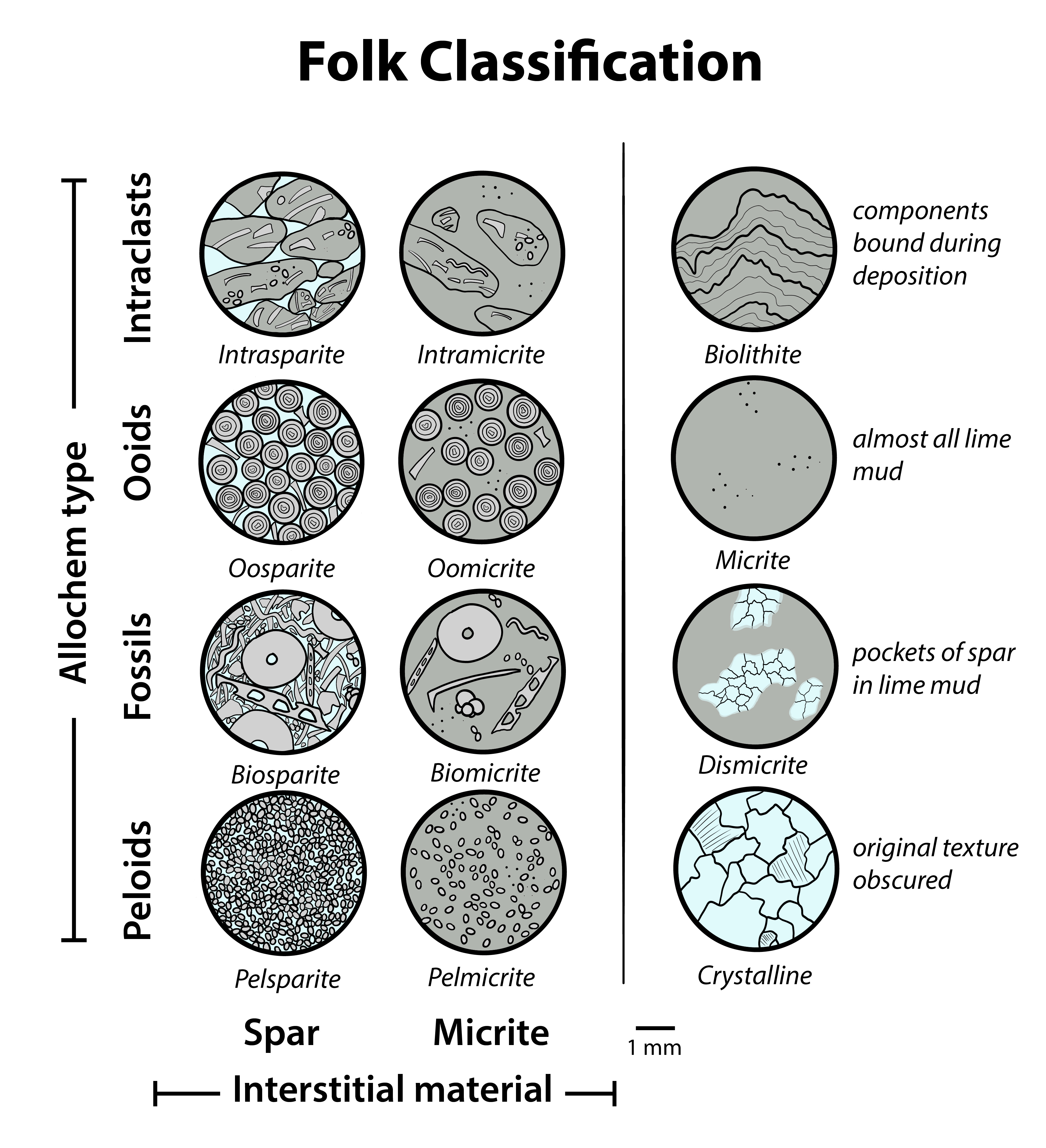
Diagram illustrating Folk's (1959) Carbonate classification scheme

A recent study of carbonate classification within academia and industry by Lokier and Al Junaibi (2016) has highlighted a strong decline in the use of the Folk Classification with 89% of classifications employing some form of the Dunham classification system.

=== Suffixes ===
The suffix -sparite is used if the rock has a crystalline matrix, and -micrite if it contains a micritic, or mud-based, matrix.

=== Prefixes ===
The prefix describing the main (non-matrix) component of the rock immediately precedes the suffix, a second prefix describing a second important component may be tagged on to the front of this.

- oo- used to denote the presence of ooids
- bio- used to describe biogenetic remnants - for example, shells, echinoderm ossicles or other tests
- pel- describes the presence of peloids (fossilised fecal pellets). May also be used to describe any pellet under 2 mm in diameter (as peloids are often hard to distinguish from intraclasts after diagenesis)
- intra- denotes the presence of intraclasts, for example quartz grains or carbonate clasts eroded from the surrounding rocks.

=== Example ===
A rock consisting mainly of ooids with some shelly fragments, with a crystalline matrix, would be termed a biooosparite.

=== Components Gallery ===
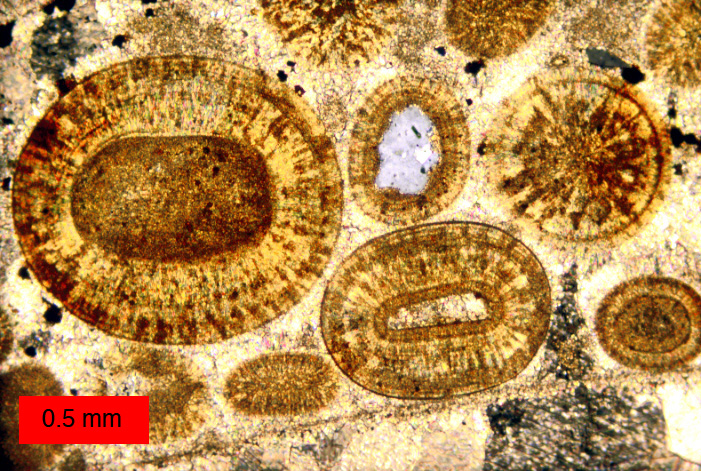
Thin-section of a biooosparite with calcitic ooids and sparry calcite cement; Carmel Formation, Middle Jurassic, of southern Utah, USA.

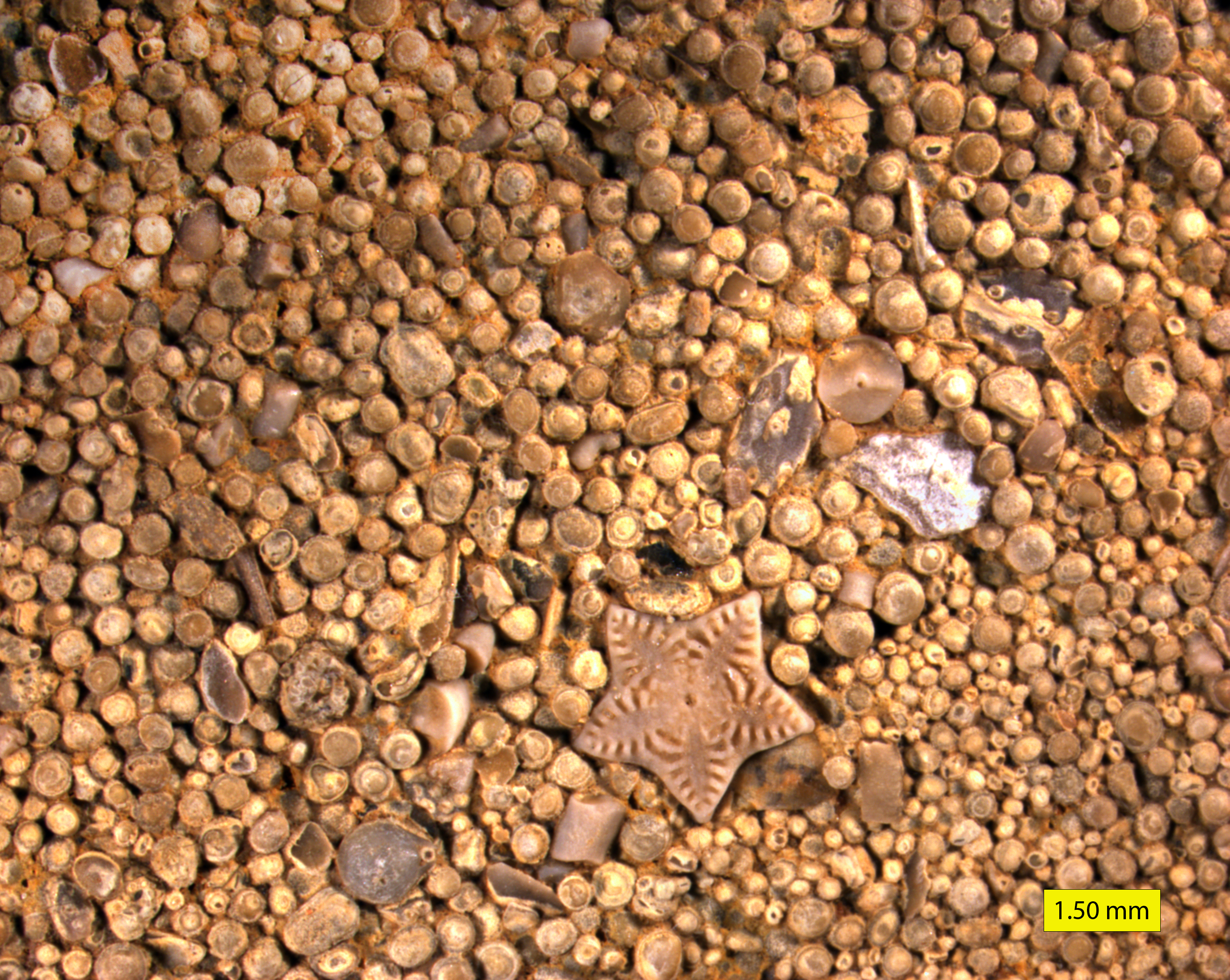
Biooosparite with calcitic ooids and sparry calcite cement; Carmel Formation, Middle Jurassic, of southern Utah, USA.

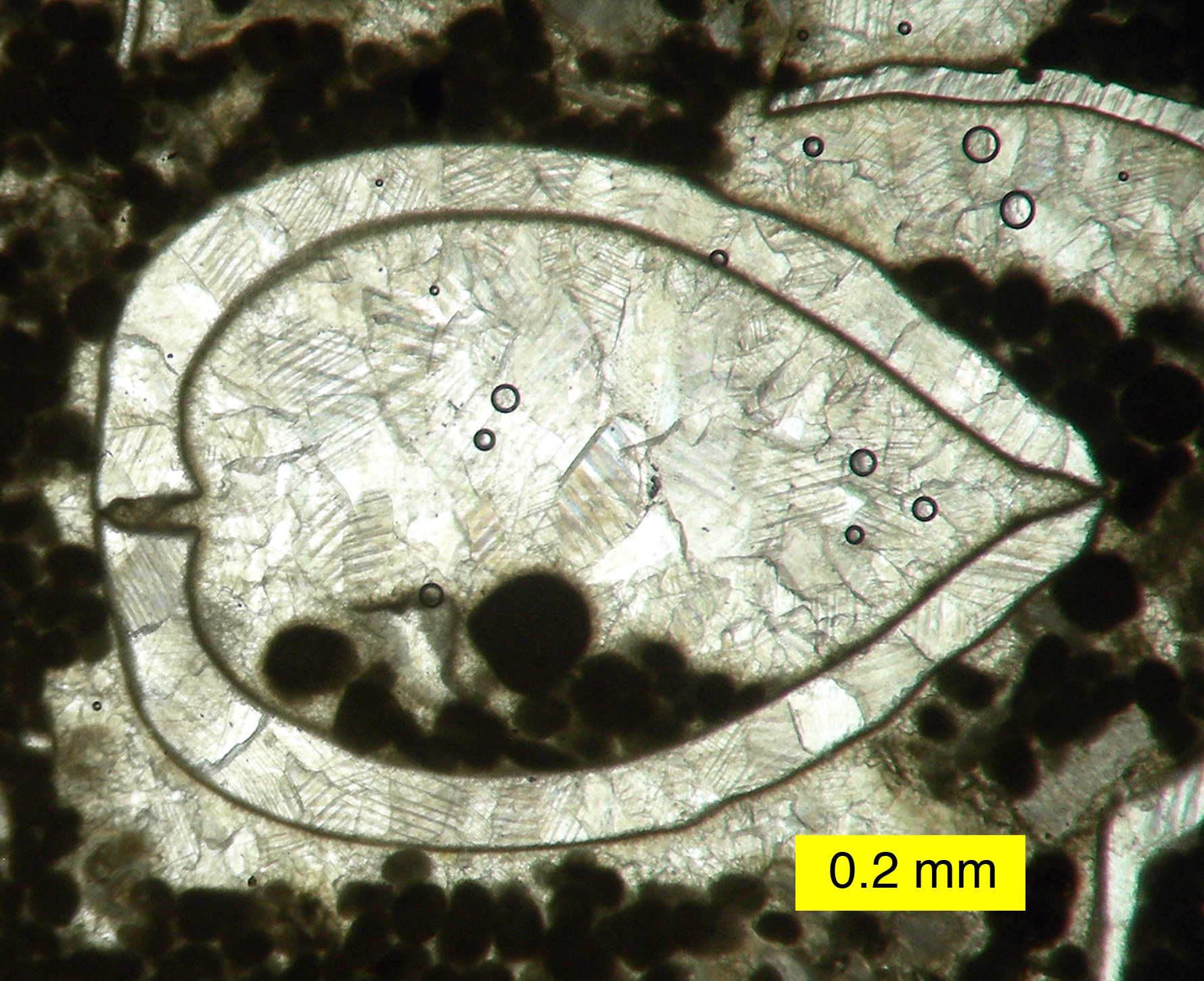
Thin section of a biopelsparite showing a geopetal structure consisting of peloid sediment and sparry calcite cement in a recrystallized bivalve shell; Bird Spring Formation (Carboniferous) of southern Nevada, USA.

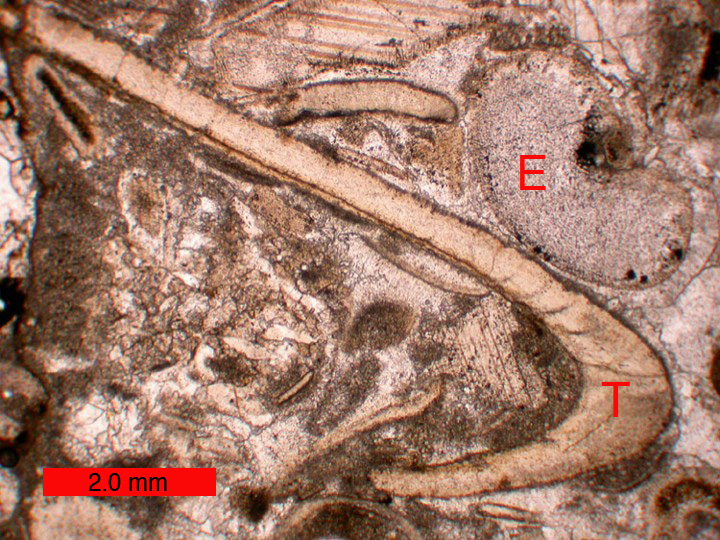
Bioclasts in an Ordovician biosparite of southern Ohio, USA.;
T = trilobite;
E = echinoderm

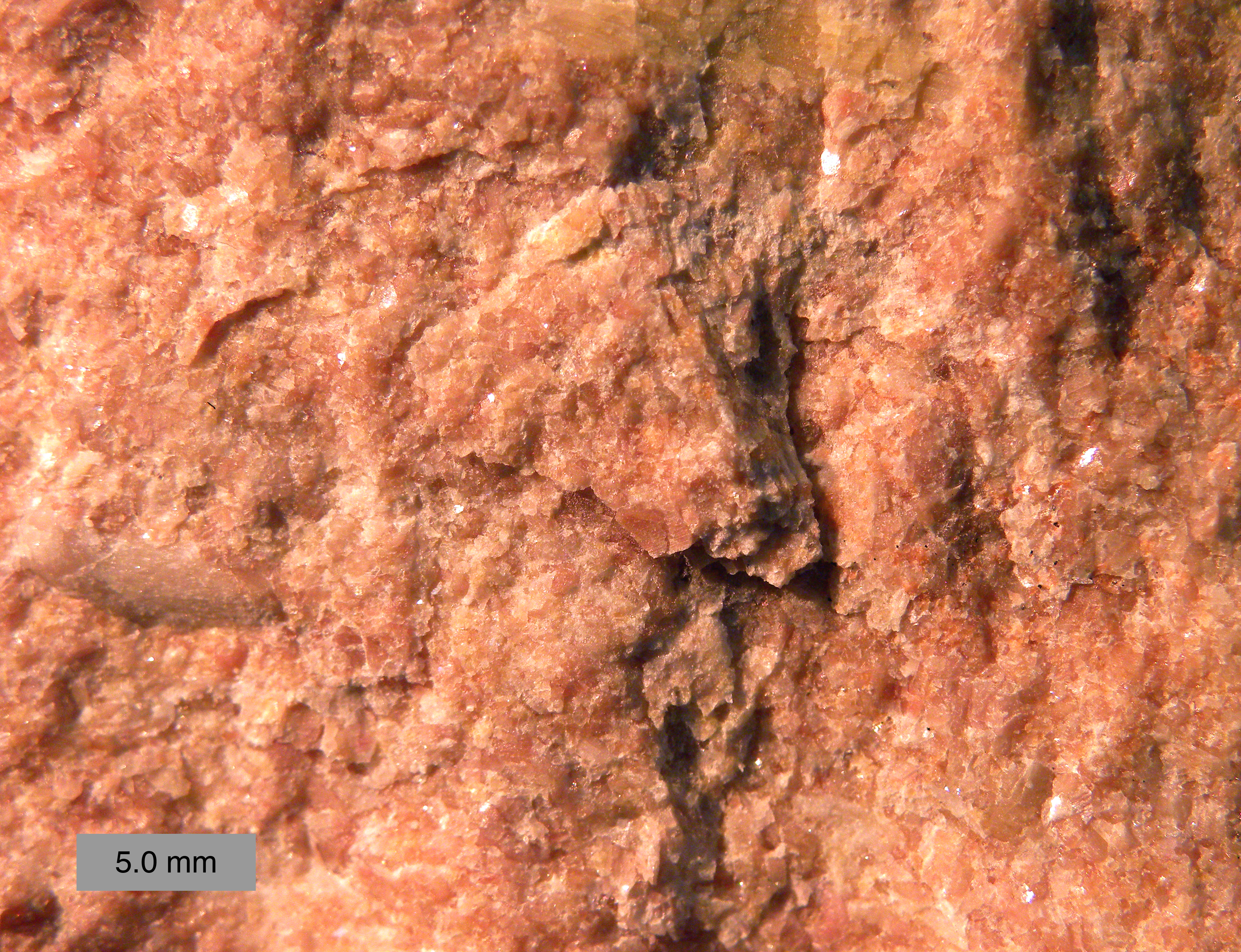
Broken surface of Brassfield Formation (Early Silurian, Ohio) showing coarse sparry cement.

=== Thin Section Gallery ===
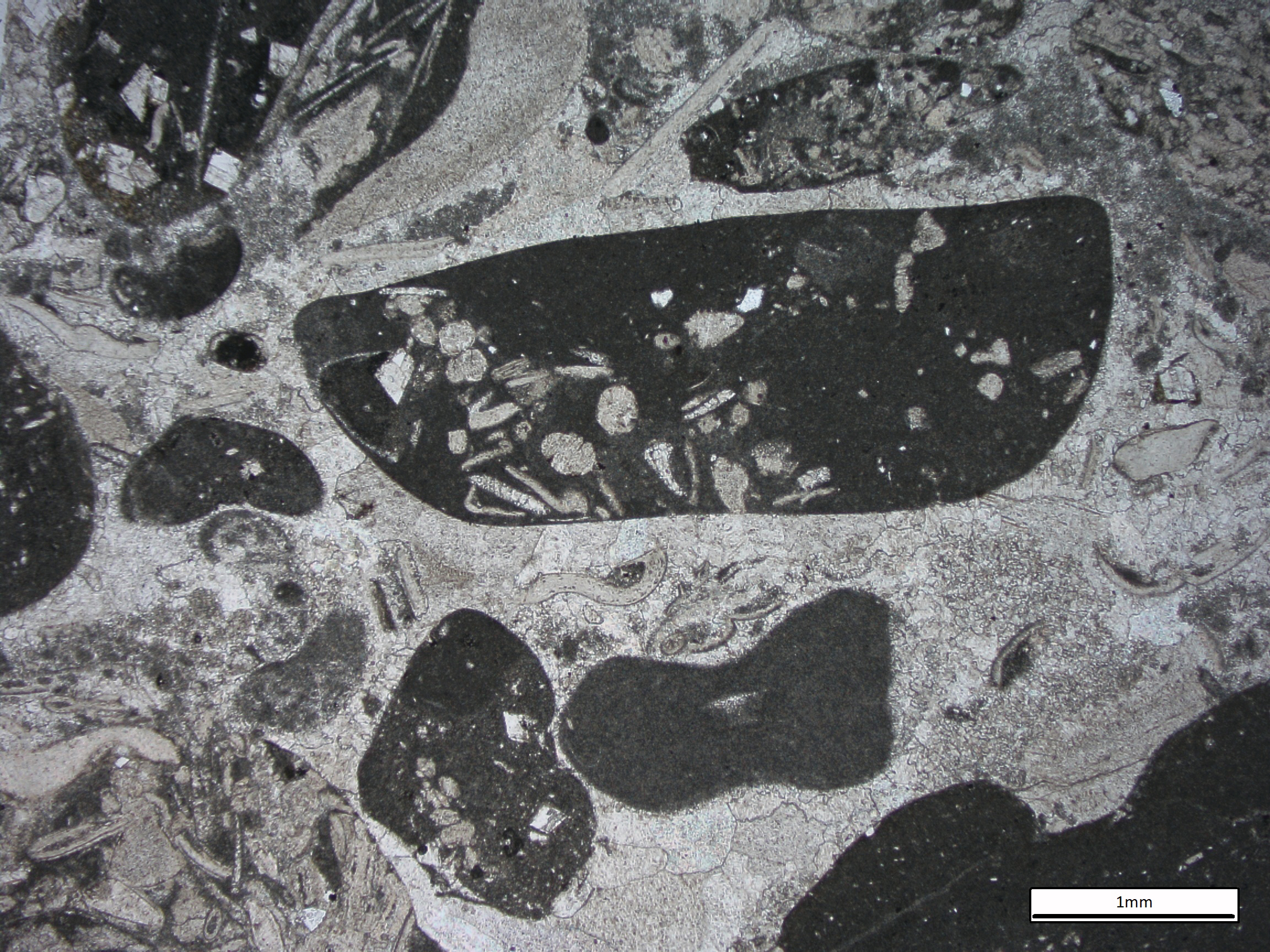
Photomicrograph (PPL) of lithoclasts and skeletal material in an intrasparite.

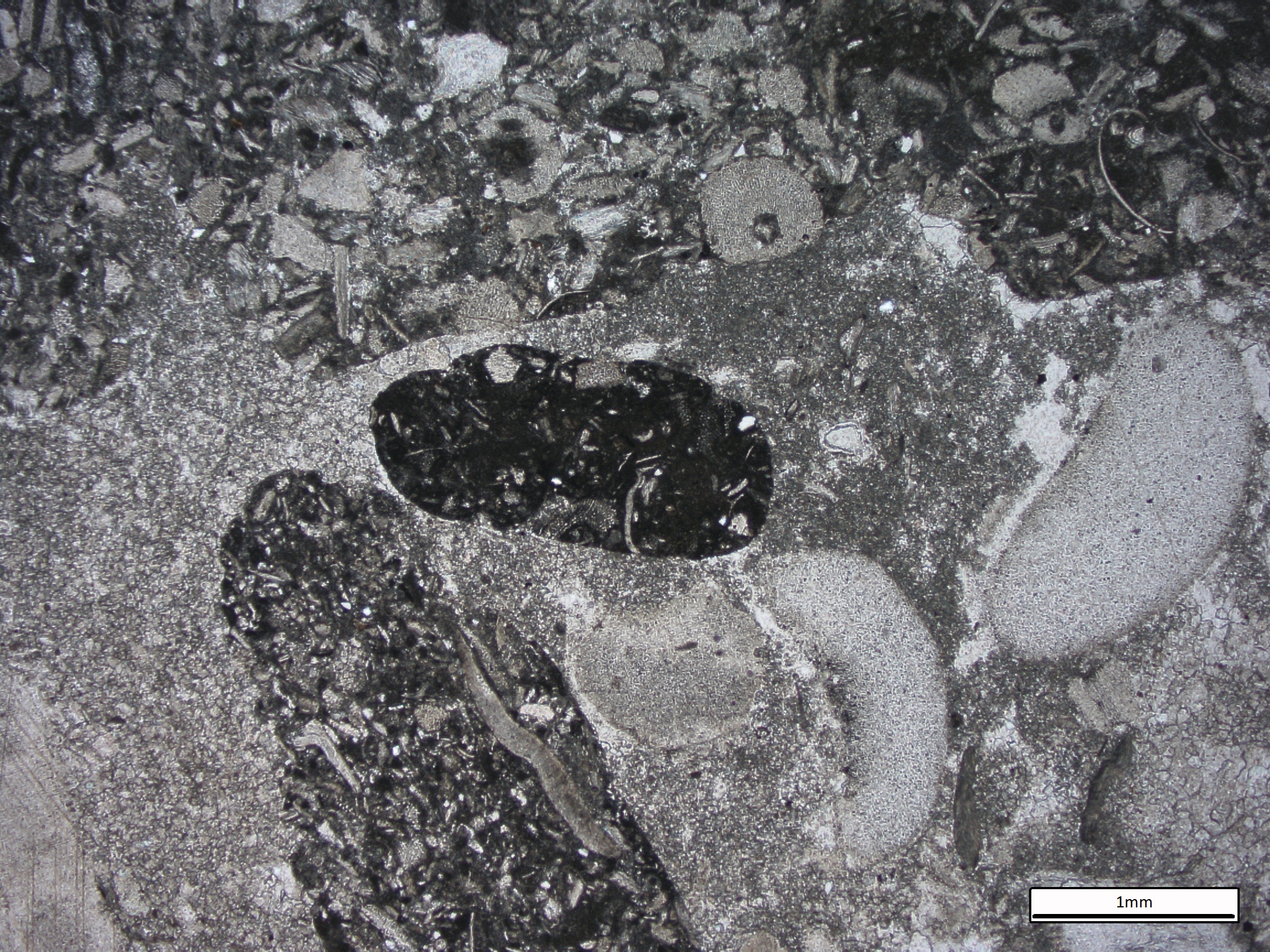
Photomicrograph (PPL) of lithoclasts and skeletal material in an intramicrite. Note that some of the dark micrite has started to recrystallize in the left half of the image

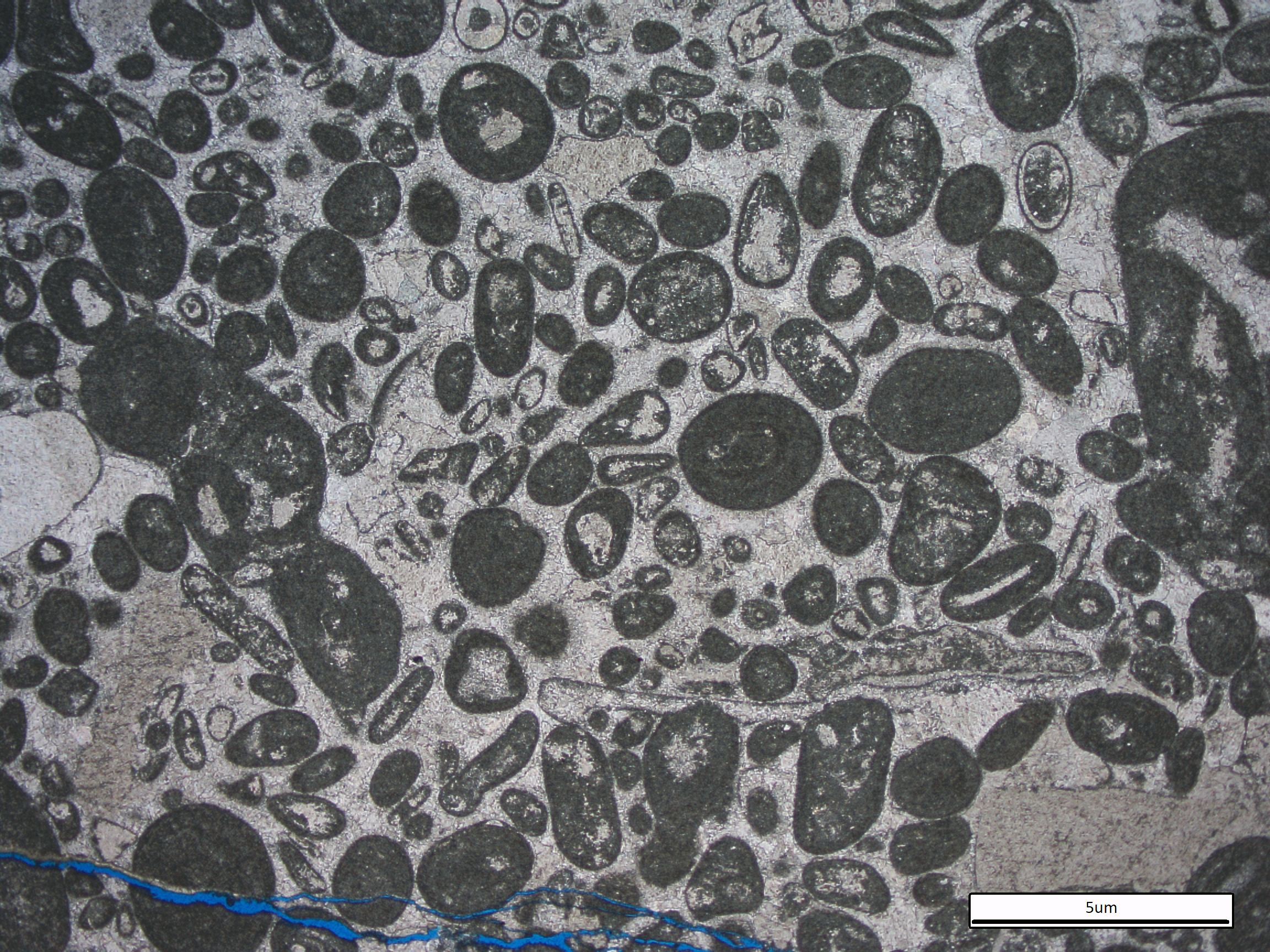
Photomicrograph (PPL) of an oosparite.

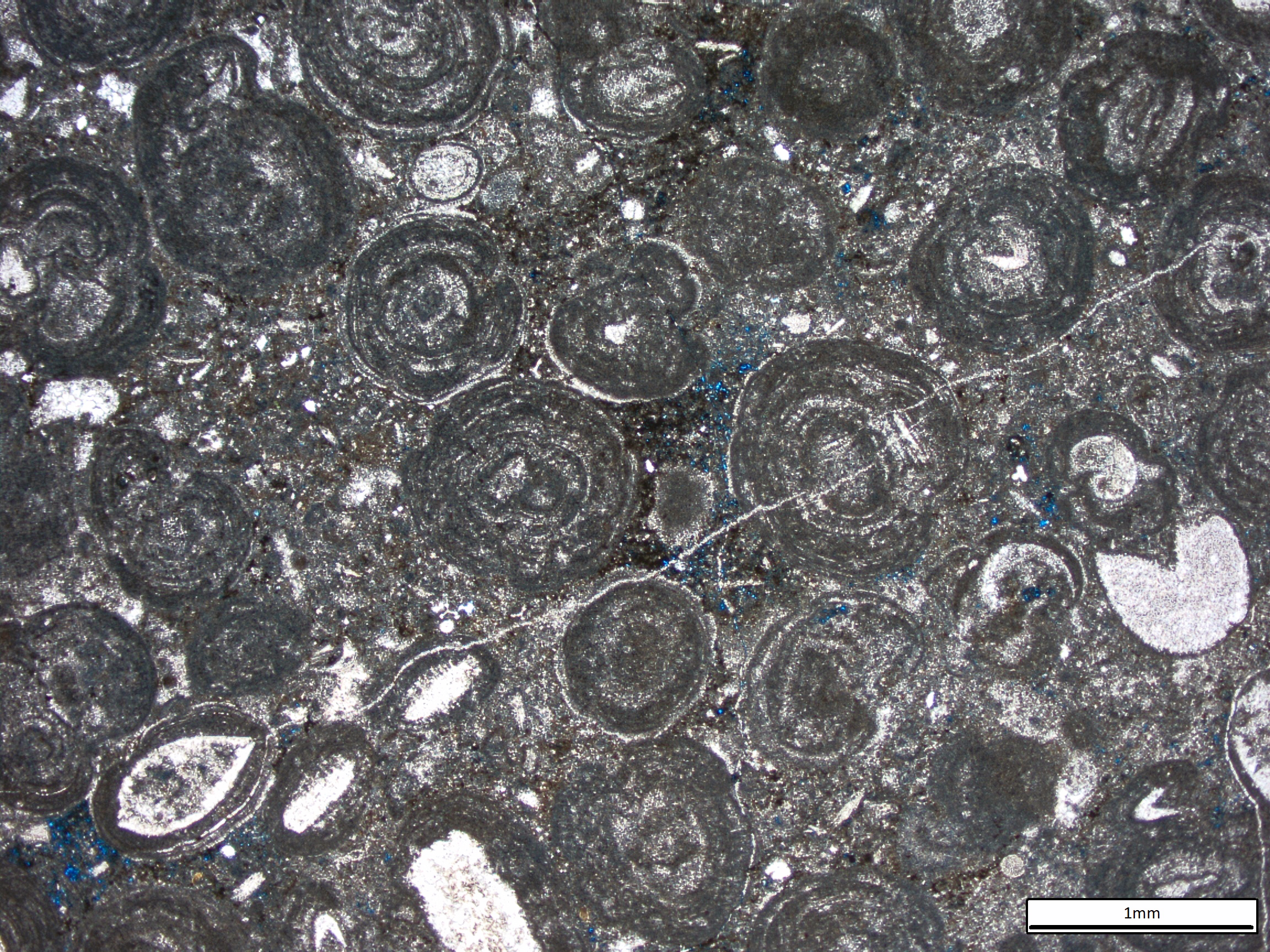
Photomicrograph (PPL) of an oomicrite from the Silurian Keel Formation, Oklahoma

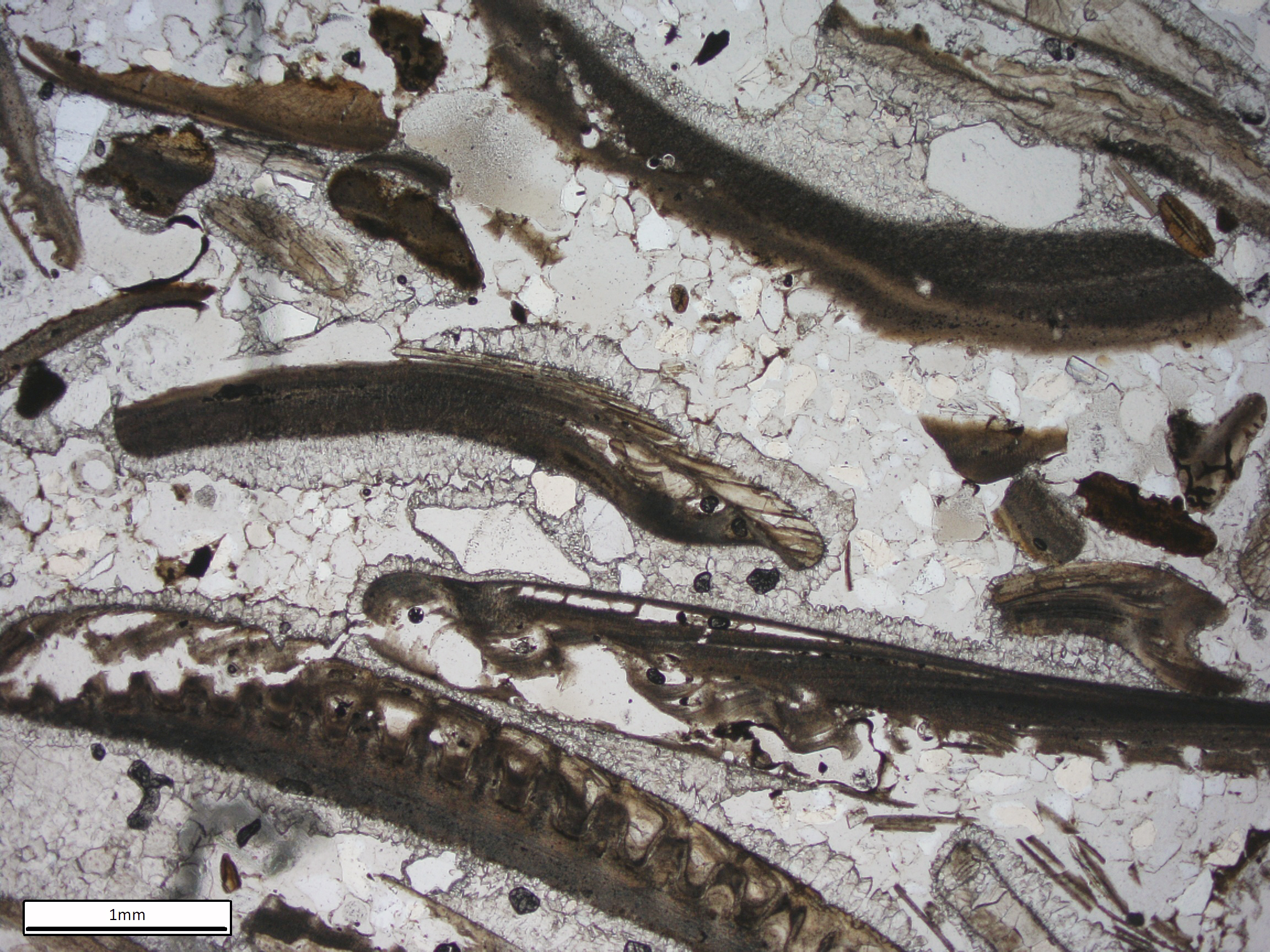
Photomicrograph (PPL) of a biosparite

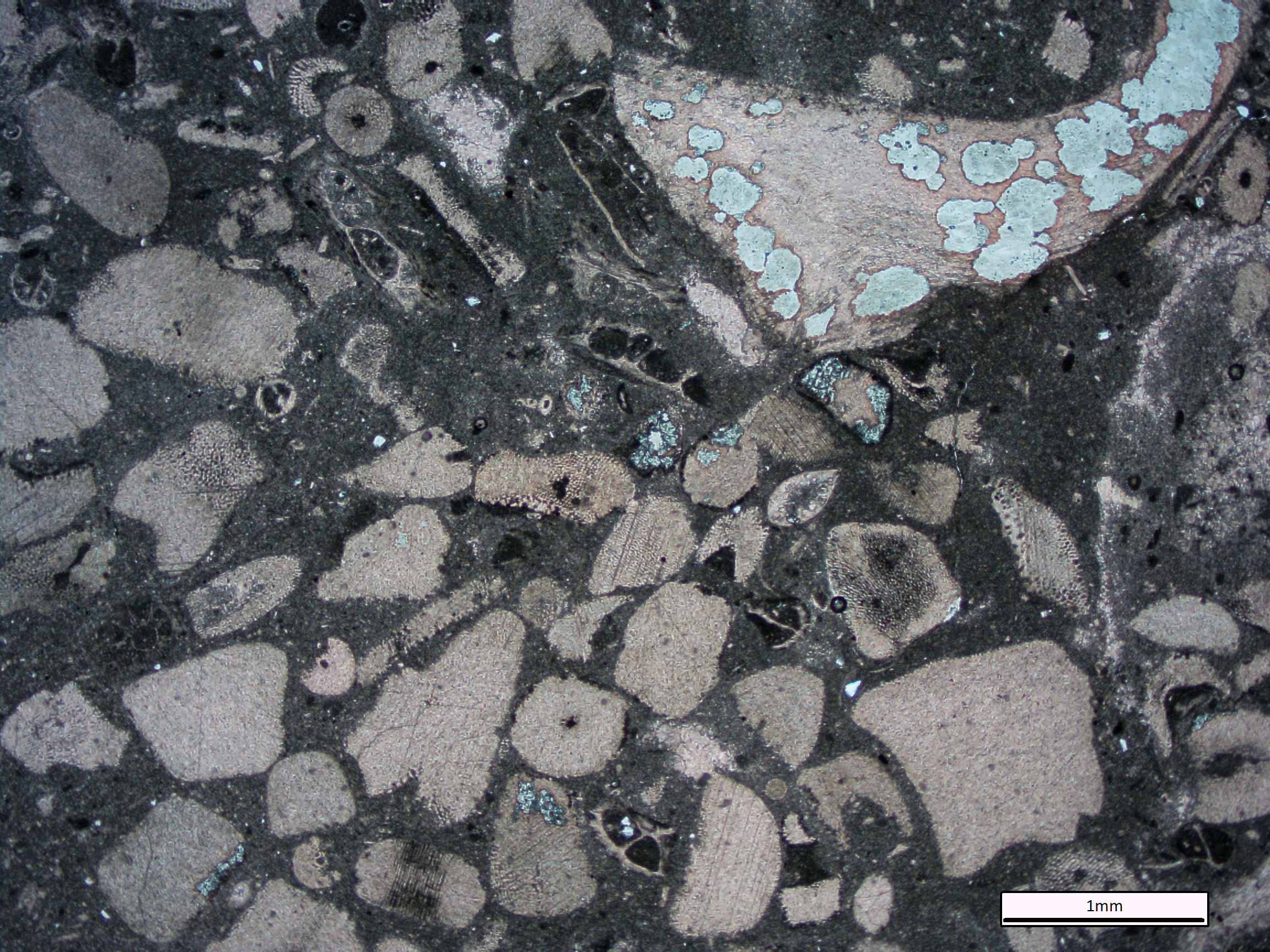
Photomicrograph (PPL) of a biomicrite from the Mississippian Lodgepole Formation, SW Montana

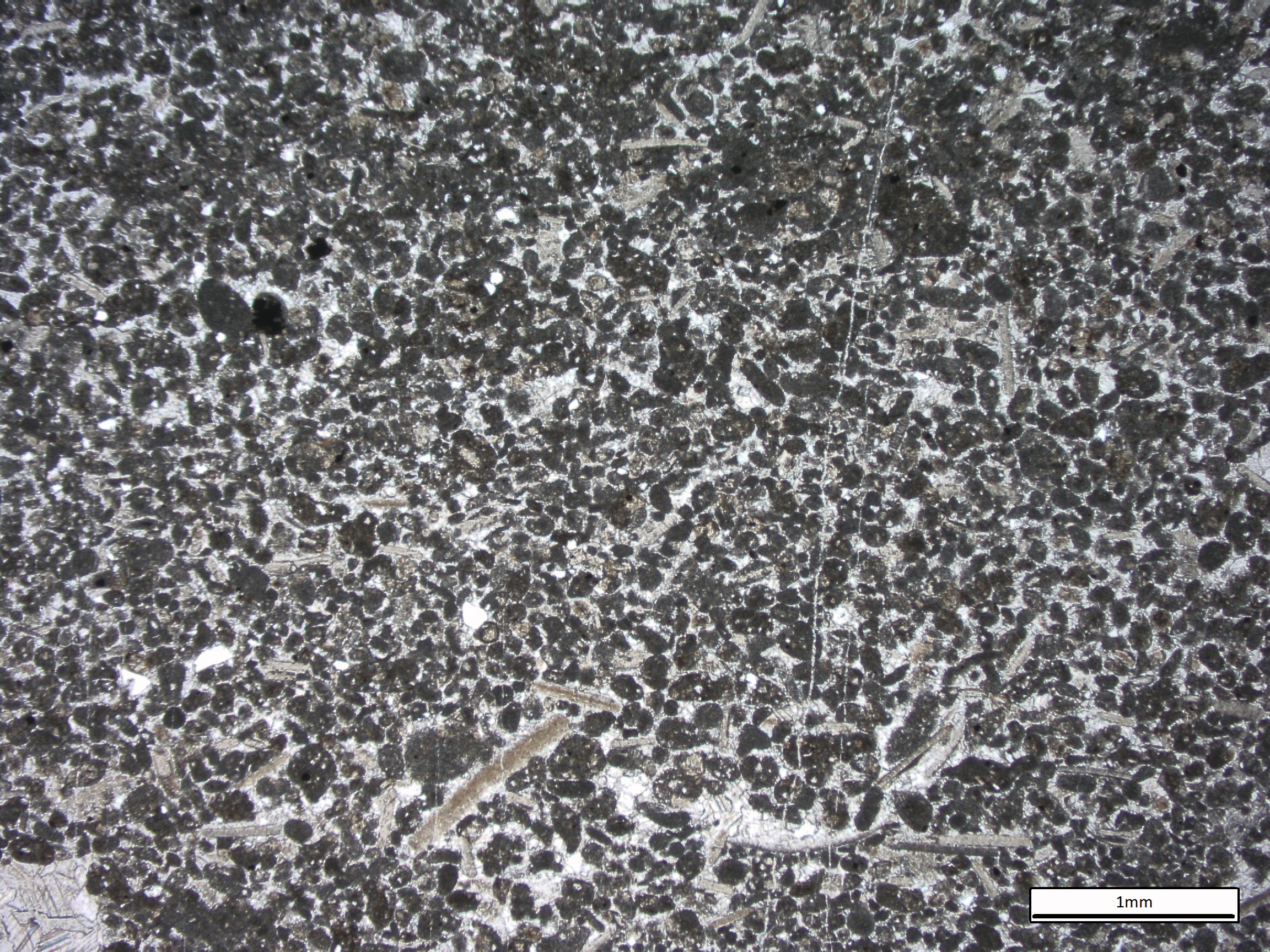
Photomicrograph (PPL) of a pelsparite.

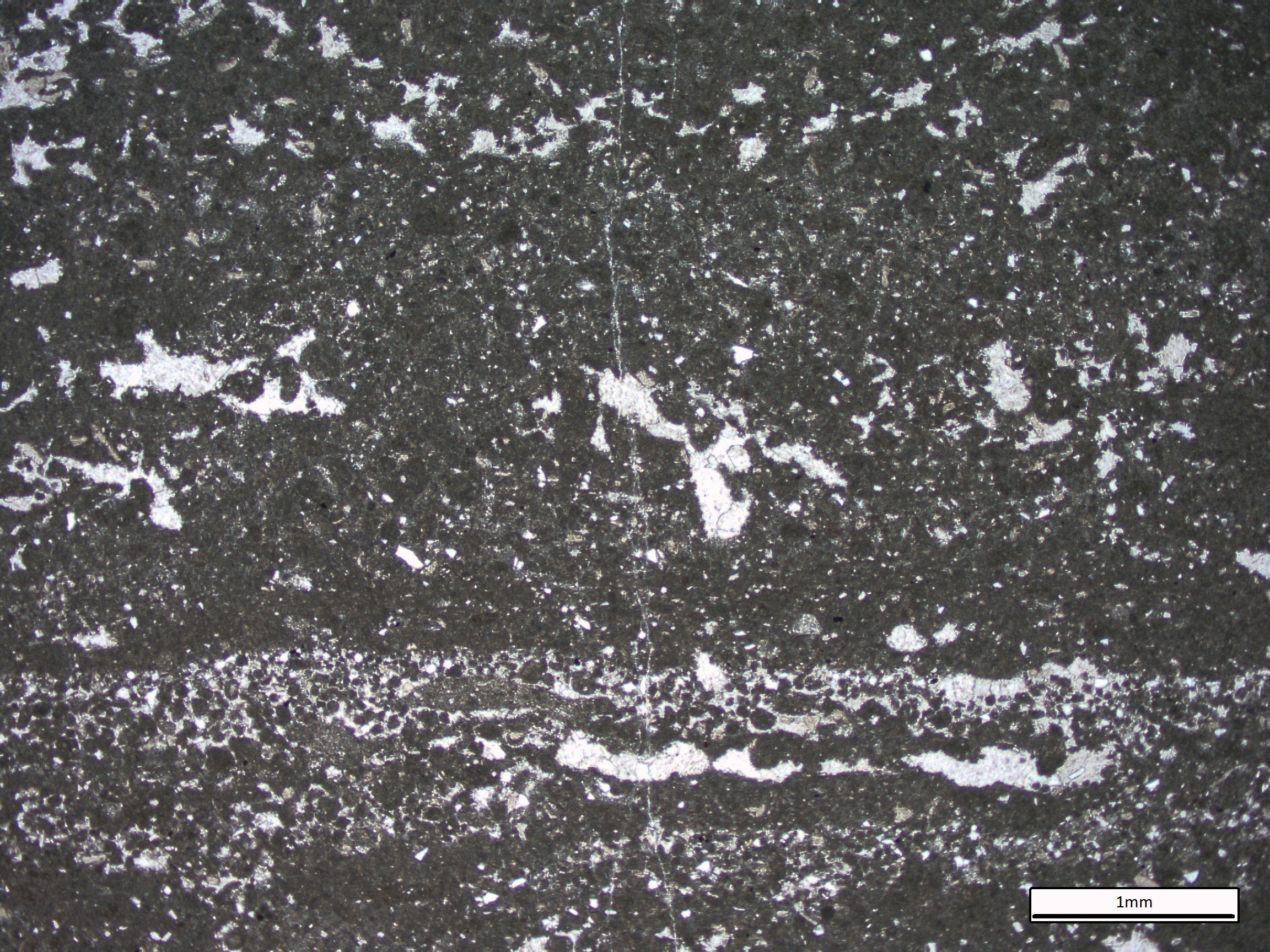
Photomicrograph (PPL) of a possible pelmicrite. Note that the odds of being able to distinguish peloids from the surrounding micrite are slim.

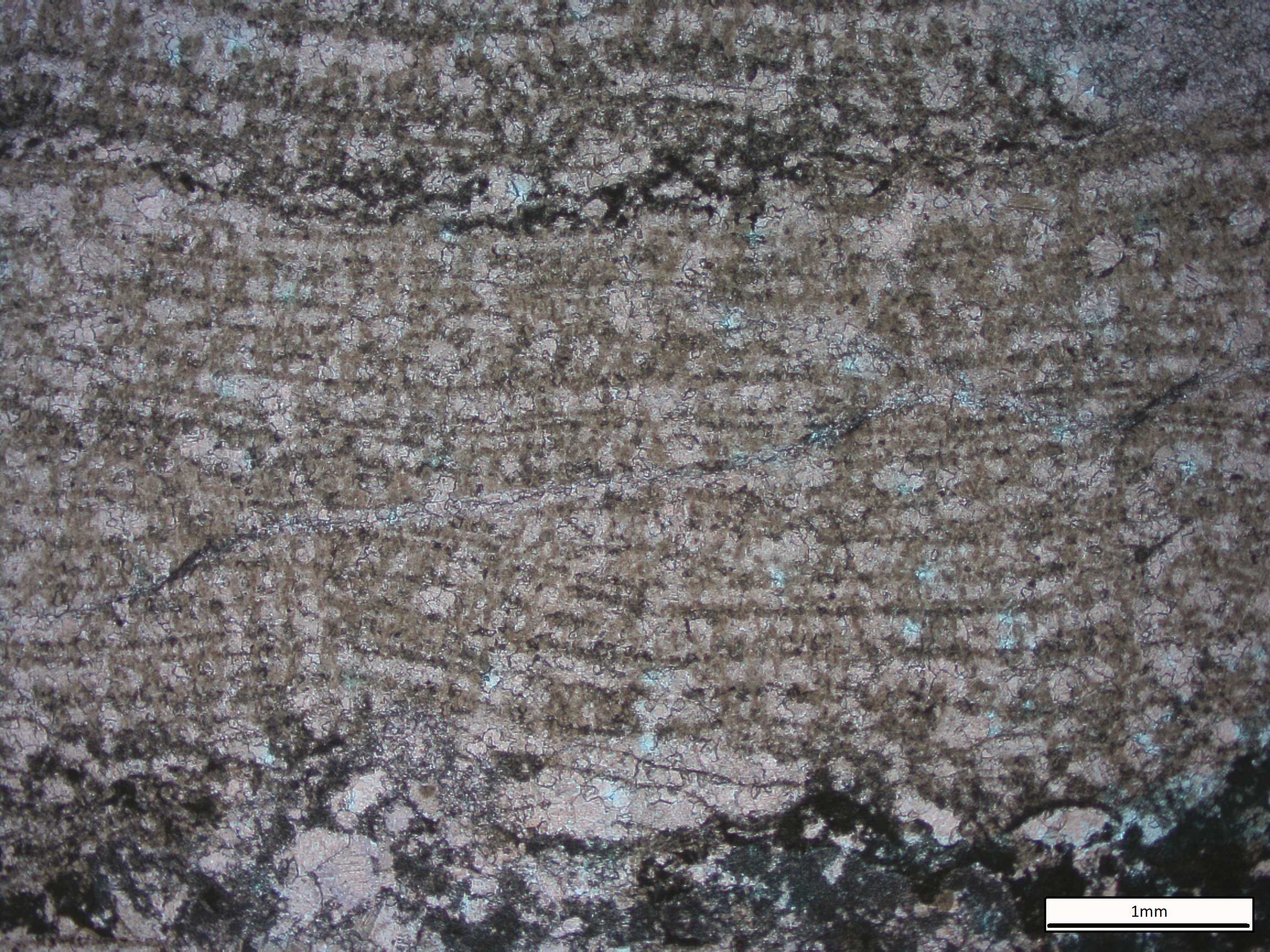
Photomicrograph (PPL) of a stromatoporoid boundstone.

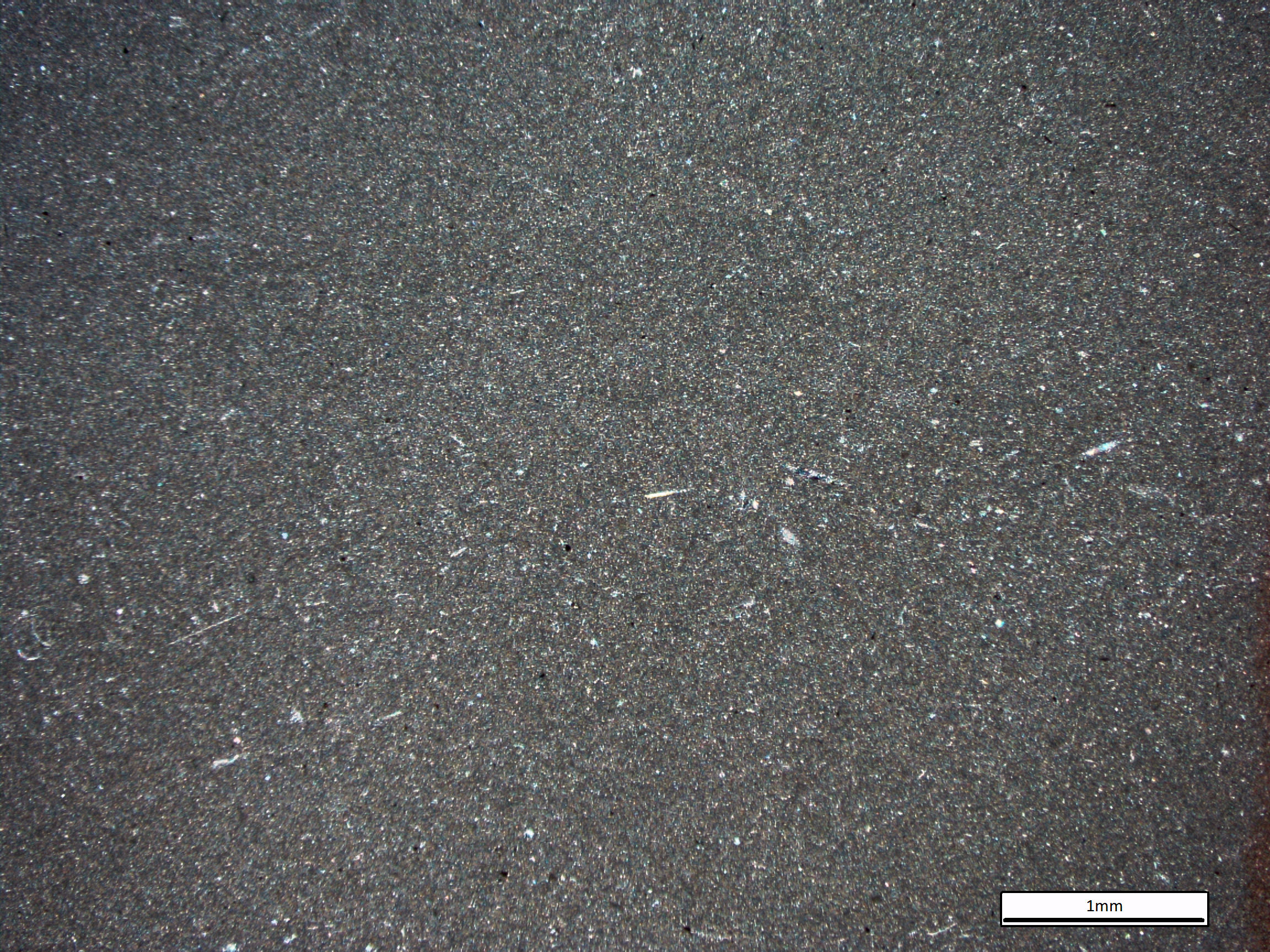
Photomicrograph (PPL) of a lime mudstone.

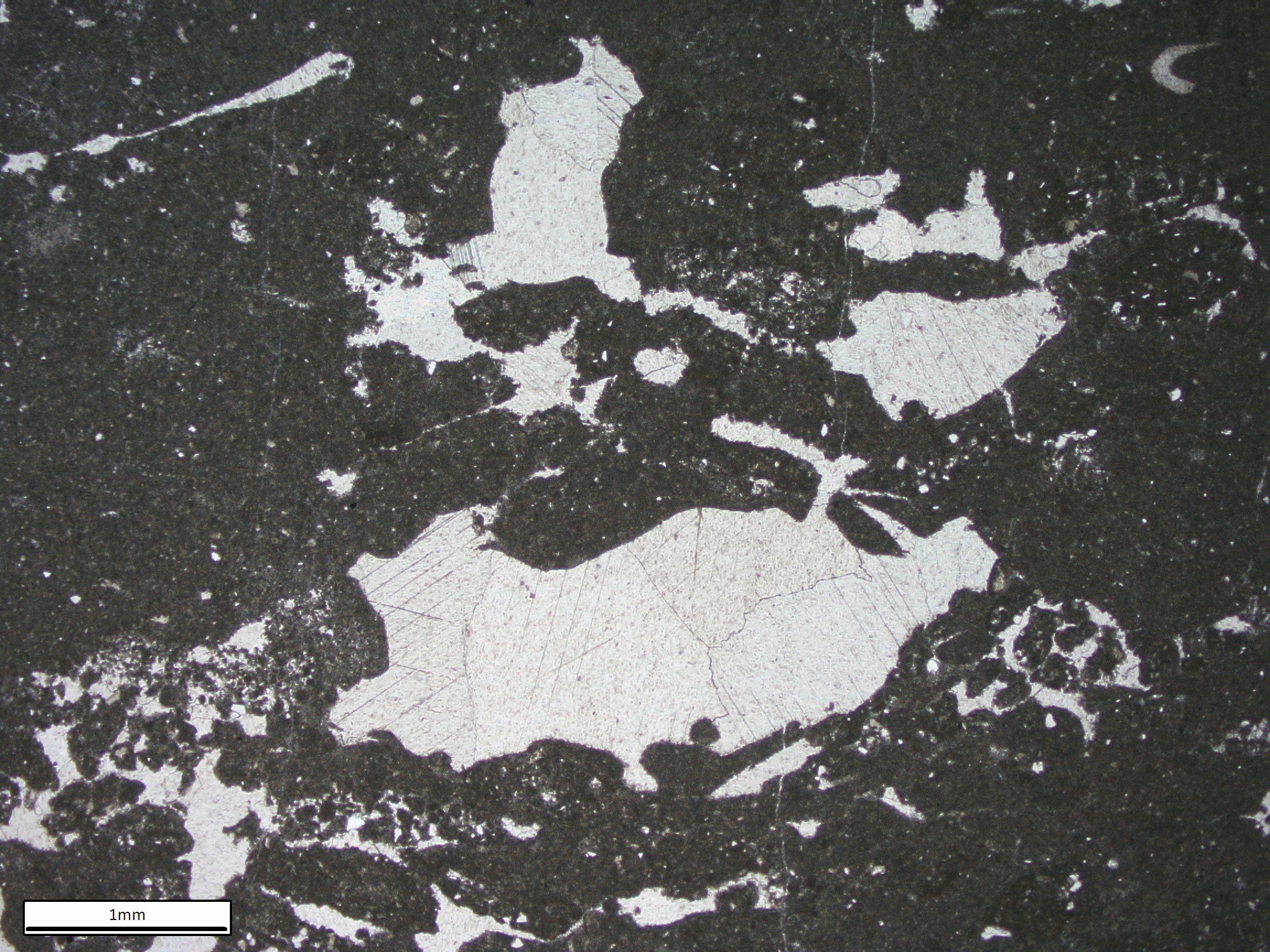
Photomicrograph (PPL) of a dismicrite

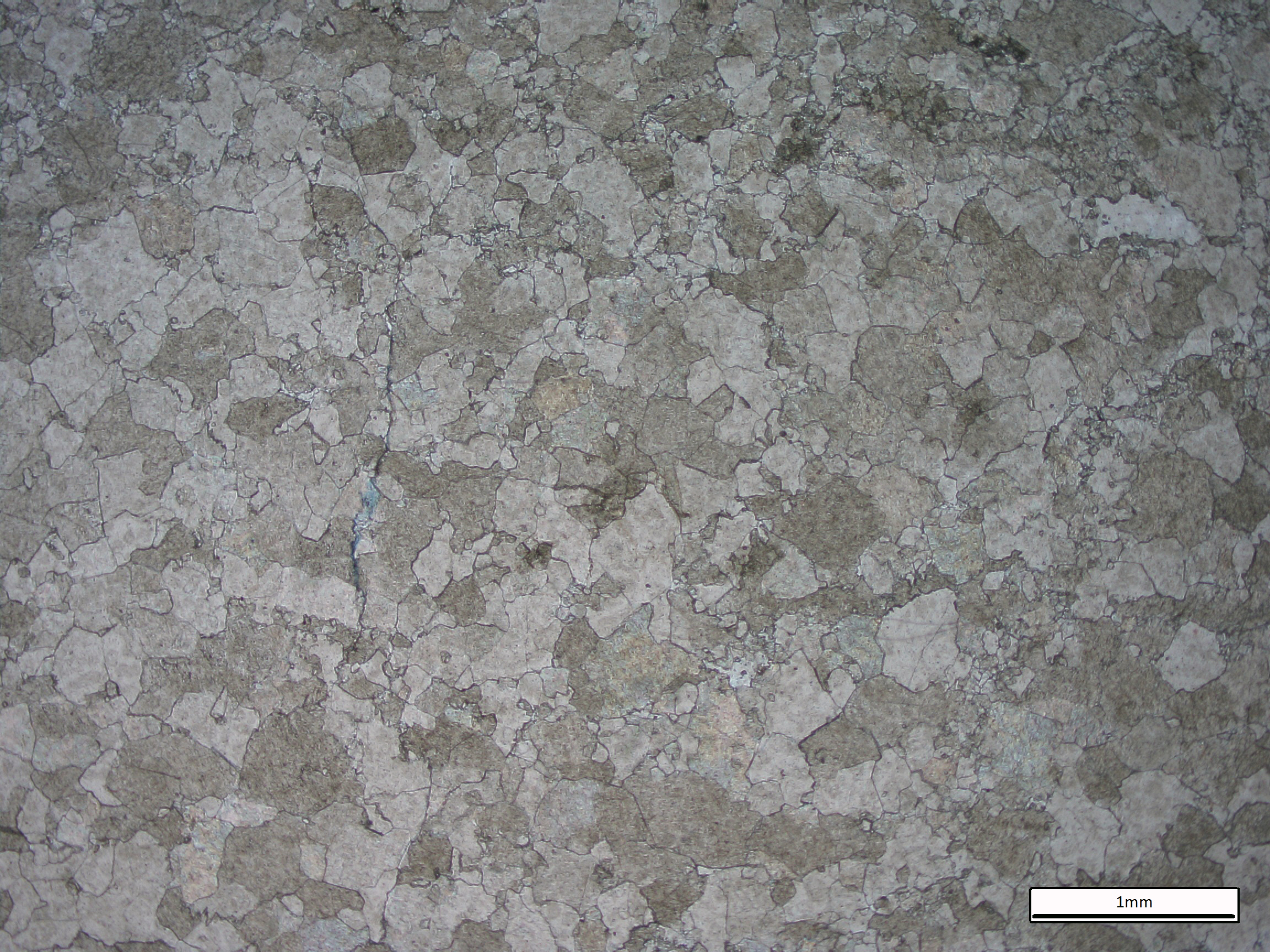
Photomicrograph (PPL) of a recrystallized (and dolomitized) limestone

== See also ==
- Dunham classification
- Gazzi-Dickinson method
- QFL Diagram, similar to the QFR diagram of the Folk classification system.
