= Lithic fragment (geology) =

Lithic fragments, or lithics, are pieces of other rocks that have been eroded down to sand size and now are sand grains in a sedimentary rock. They were first described and named (in their modern definitions) by Bill Dickinson in 1970. Lithic fragments can be derived from sedimentary, igneous or metamorphic rocks. A lithic fragment is defined using the Gazzi-Dickinson point-counting method and being in the sand-size fraction. Sand grains in sedimentary rocks that are fragments of larger rocks that are not identified using the Gazzi-Dickinson method are usually called rock fragments instead of lithic fragments. Sandstones rich in lithic fragments are called lithic sandstones.

== Types ==
=== Igneous (Lv) ===
These can include granular (~rhyolitic), microlitic (~andesitic), lathwork (~basaltic), and vitric (glassy). These correlations between composition and volcanic lithic fragment type are approximate, at best. By definition, intrusive igneous rock fragments can not be considered lithic fragments.

=== Sedimentary (Ls) ===
These can include shale siltstone fragments, and (at times) chert.

=== Metamorphic (Lm) ===
These can include fine-grained schist and phyllite fragments, among others.

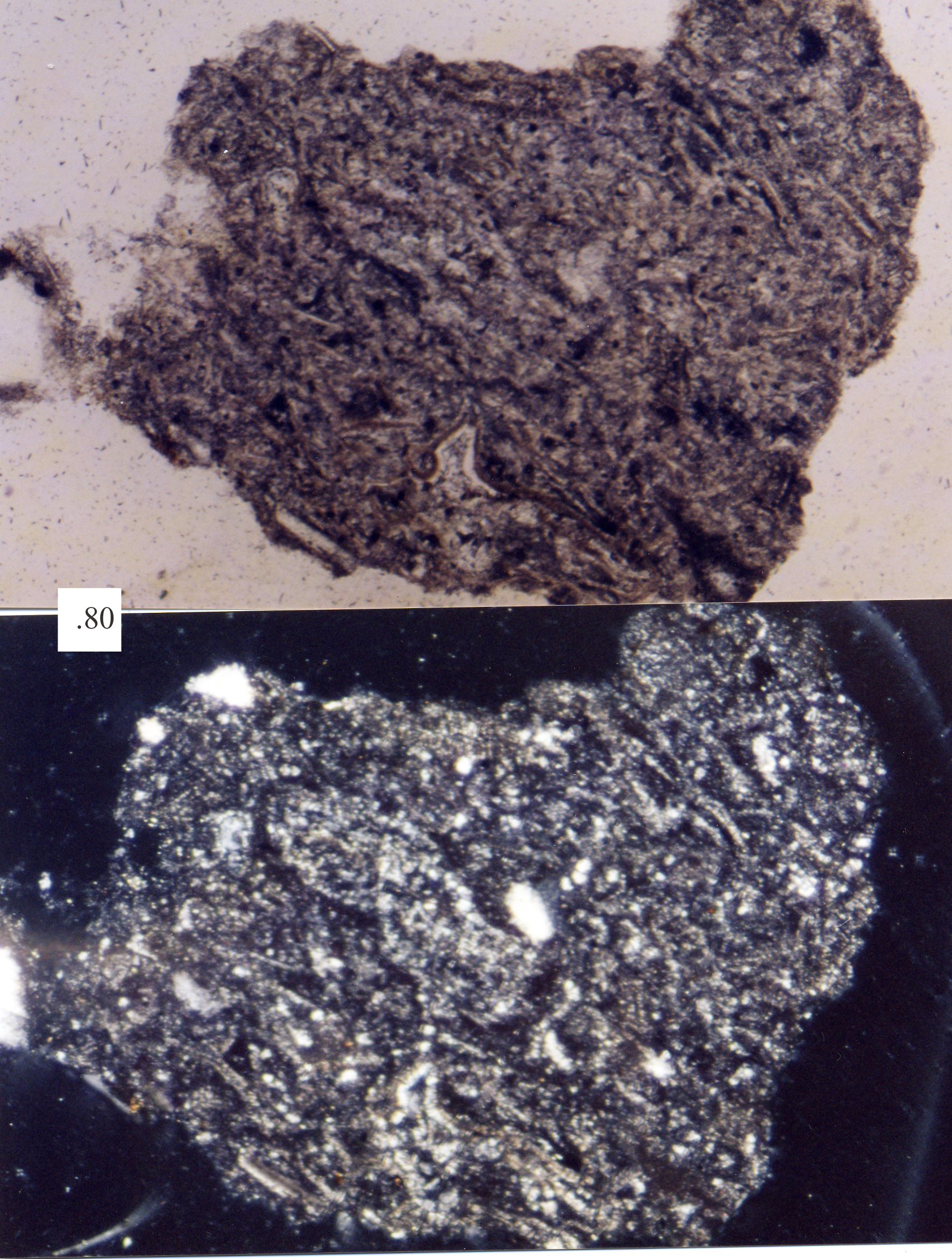
Granular volcanic lithic fragment, scale in millimeters Top picture in plane-polarized light, bottom picture in cross-polarized light.

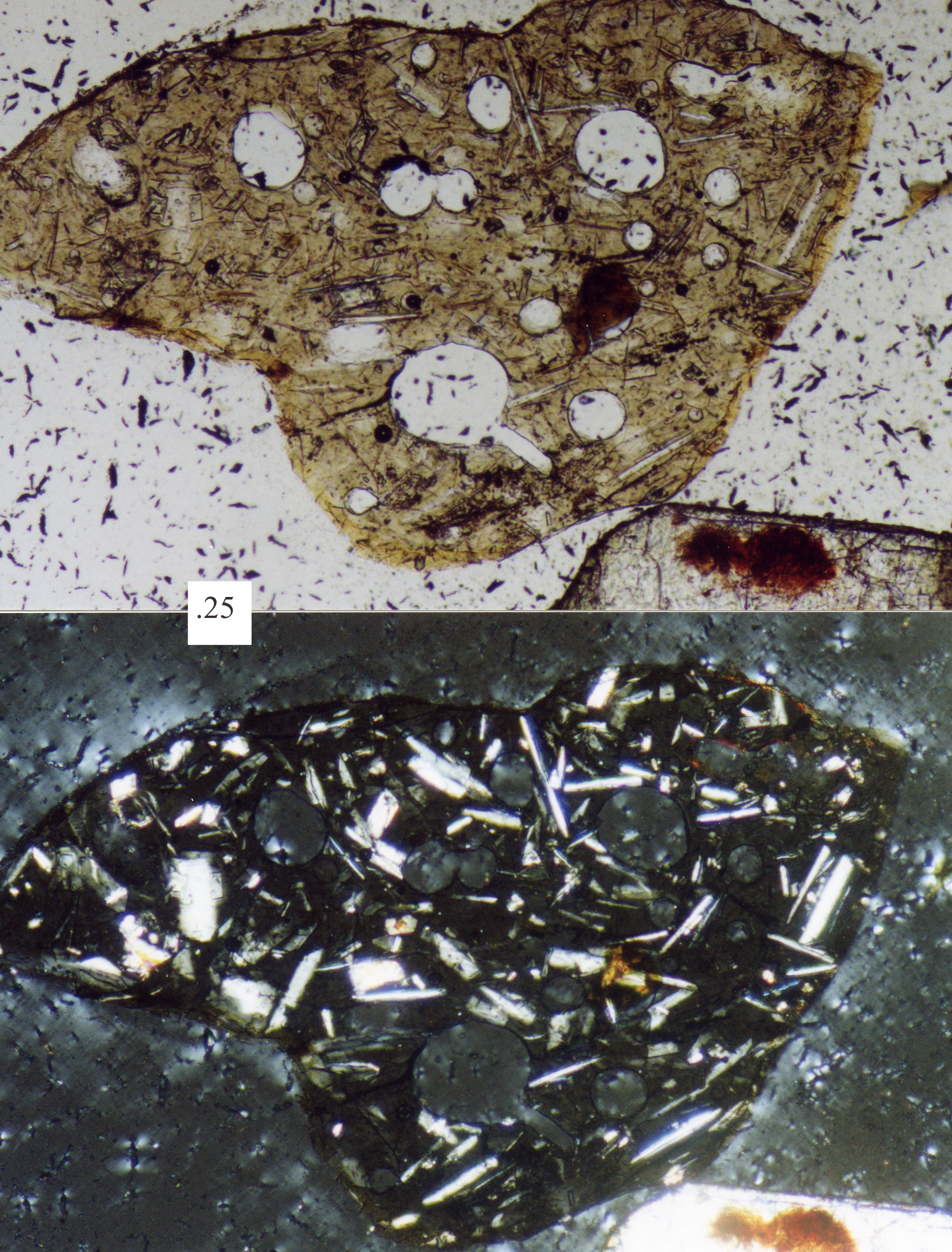
Microlitic volcanic lithic fragment, scale in millimeters. Top picture in plane-polarized light, bottom picture in cross-polarized light.

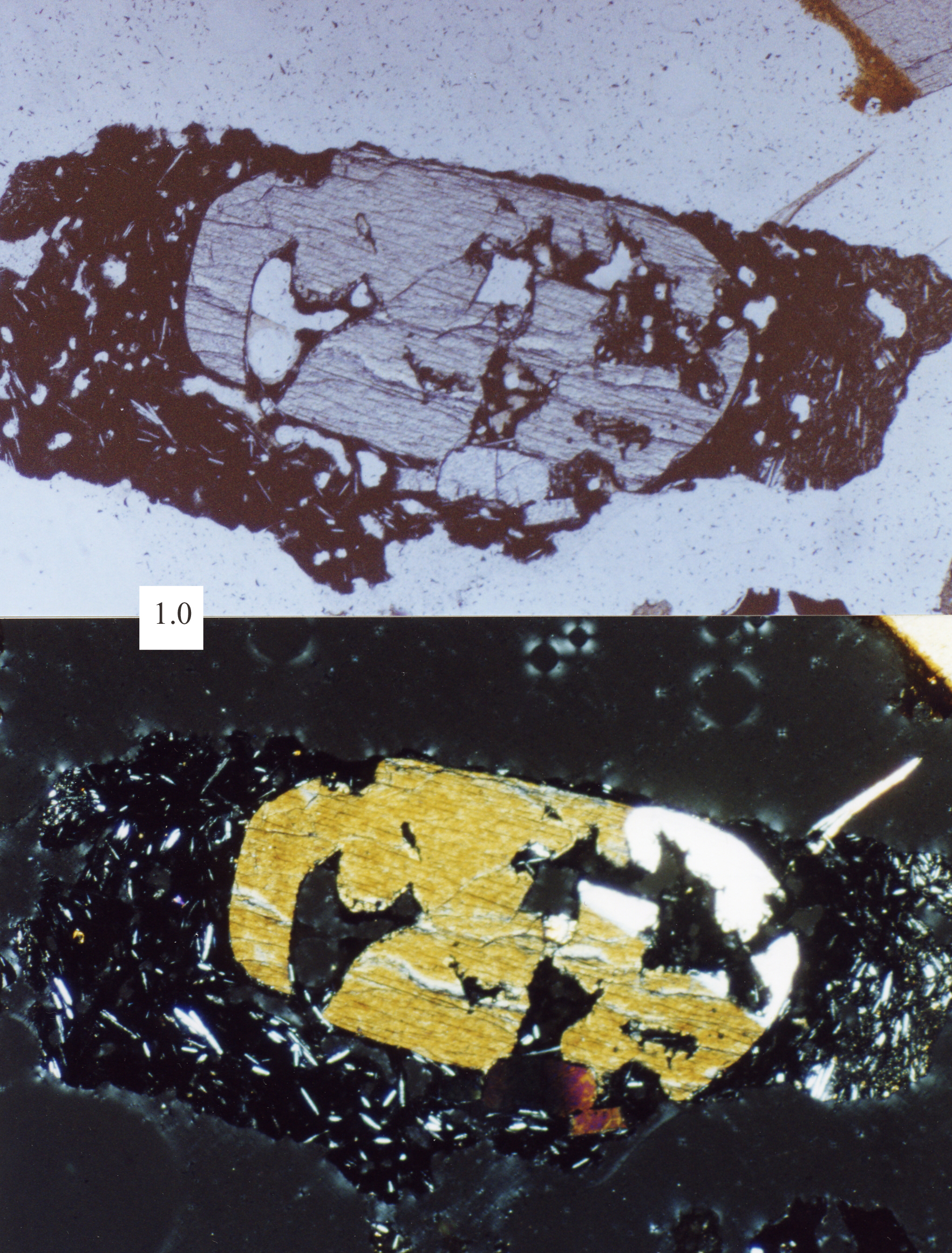
Lathwork volcanic lithic fragment, scale in millimeters. Top picture in plane-polarized light, bottom picture in cross-polarized light.

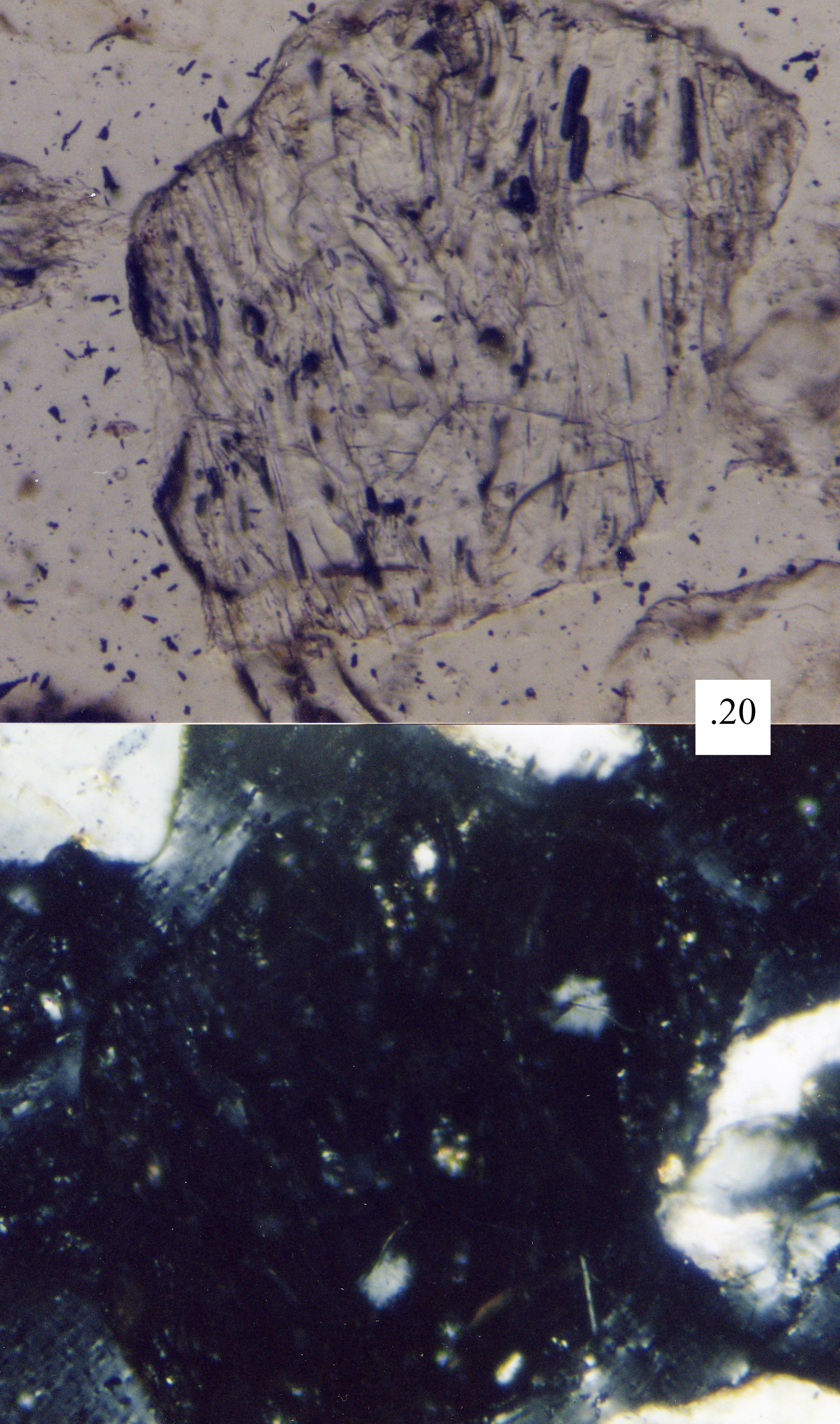
Vitric volcanic lithic fragment, scale in millimeters. Top picture in plane-polarized light, bottom picture in cross-polarized light.
