= Neomorphism =

Metamorphic process

Neomorphism refers to the wet metamorphic process in which diagenetic alterations systematically transform minerals into either polymorphs or crystalline structures that are structurally identical to the rock(s) from which they developed.

Coined by the late Robert L. Folk, neomorphism encompasses the functions of both recrystallization and inversion, which are geological processes that deal primarily with rock reformation. The neomorphic process, as it relates to geology and petrography, is one of the many major processes that sustain both carbonate minerals and limestone. Neomorphism is largely held accountable for the metastability of aragonite and magnesium-rich calcite, and when conditions permit, neomorphic reactions and interactions can result in texture loss and/or feature deformation of affected rock formations.

== Types of neomorphism ==
=== Recrystallization ===
The term "recrystallization" broadly refers to the many metamorphic processes that change the size and/or shape of crystal formations and preserve the chemical composition and mineralogy of the original mineral. Because recrystallization accounts for the majority of all visible changes produced by neomorphism, the terms "neomorphism" and "recrystallization" implicitly allude to each other and can therefore be used interchangeably under most circumstances. In petrology, there are two forms of recrystallization: recrystallization by inversion and recrystallization by replacement.

=== Inversion ===
Inversion is a complex form of neomorphism in which the recrystallization process transforms polymorphs into different polymorphs. Polymorphs, to be clear, are minerals that differ from one another in their crystalline structures but are otherwise composed of identical quantities and types of elements. As with any change in mineral structure, the alteration of polymorphs occurs most often in environments characterized by certain optimal temperatures and pressure levels. Optimal temperature and pressure levels vary in accordance to the type of mineral(s) under consideration.

Specifically, an increase in temperature incites an increase in atomic vibrations, which instigates atoms to distance themselves from each other. The excited atoms continue expanding until the increase in temperature can no longer provide the energy necessary for further expansion. Affected crystals and/or minerals are forced to adapt to the aforementioned atomic changes by expanding their skeletal structures, which results in visible changes of the aforementioned crystals and minerals. All the while, pressure continuously compresses the altered crystals and minerals into dense structures; the final product is a collection of chemically-identical crystals that differs structurally and visibly from its predecessor.

Perhaps the most pervasive example of inversion occurs on carbon. The inversion of carbon, depending on the temperature and pressure of the environment, results in one of two very distinct polymorphs: Under low temperature and low pressure, recrystallization by inversion will result in coal, and under high pressure and high temperature, recrystallization by inversion will result in diamond. Both coal and diamond are derived from carbon and are chemically identical, but they differ remarkably from each other in terms of physical appearance.

=== Replacement ===
Replacement is a complex form of neomorphism in which the recrystallization process involves the dissolution of one mineral and the almost immediate "precipitation" of another in its place; the resultant mineral differs from its predecessor in terms of its chemical composition. Replacement occurs without any substantial changes in volume between the original and the reformed minerals, and the process is often characterized as being either fabric-destructive or fabric-preserving, which refer to texture loss and texture retention, respectively. The replacement of fossils with chert, for example, is often fabric-preserving, while the replacement of aragonite and calcite with dolomite is fabric-destructive. On a side note, this particular process (the replacement of aragonite and calcite with dolomite) is the most common form of recrystallization by replacement. Being similar to wet polymorphic transformations, recrystallization by replacement occurs on a variety of minerals, including chert, pyrite, hematite, apatite, anhydrite, and dolomite, among others.

== Neomorphic processes ==
=== Coalescive neomorphism ===
Neomorphism is considered coalescive when the recrystallization process involves either the formation of larger crystals in the place, and at the expense, of smaller crystal formations or the formation of smaller crystals within preexisting formations of crystals. Two types of coalescive neomorphism exist in petrology: aggrading neomorphism and degrading neomorphism.

=== Aggrading neomorphism ===
Neomorphism is considered aggrading when recrystallization results in an any increase in crystal size. The crystal mosaics of the original mineral or crystal formation(s) often experience deterioration in the process and are eventually replaced with either crude crystalline mosaics or polymorphs. Both the resultant crystalline mosaics and/or polymorphs are chemically identical—with a few minor exceptions due to certain relatively minute chemical alterations that occur during the reaction processes—to the minerals from which the aggraded crystals developed.

One common form of aggrading neomorphism is called porphyroid neomorphism. Porphyroid neomorphism occurs when a small number of large crystals form in the area of static groundmasses, which are—as the name implies—areas of the ground that are characterized by relatively insignificant and unsubstantial metamorphic changes. Apart from the aforementioned, porphyroid neomorphism is characterized by the destruction of original micritic matrixes.

=== Degrading neomorphism ===
Neomorphism is considered degrading when the recrystallization process is accompanied by a net decrease in the size of any affected crystal formation(s). Degrading neomorphism is a form of coalescive neomorphism in which new crystals form from within preexisting crystals. This form of neomorphism is relatively uncommon and typically only occurs under stressed conditions and on minerals that have been left relatively unaffected by metamorphism.
