= Pseudomatrix =

Geological term

Pseudomatrix, as defined by Bill Dickinson in 1970, is the term for lithic fragments that have been deformed to become (part of or exclusively) a traditional sandstone matrix. This is formed when a lithic-rich sandstone is compacted. The compaction is usually more effective on the (typically) weaker lithic fragments in comparison to the stronger, coarser-grained framework grains.
