= Peloid (geology) =

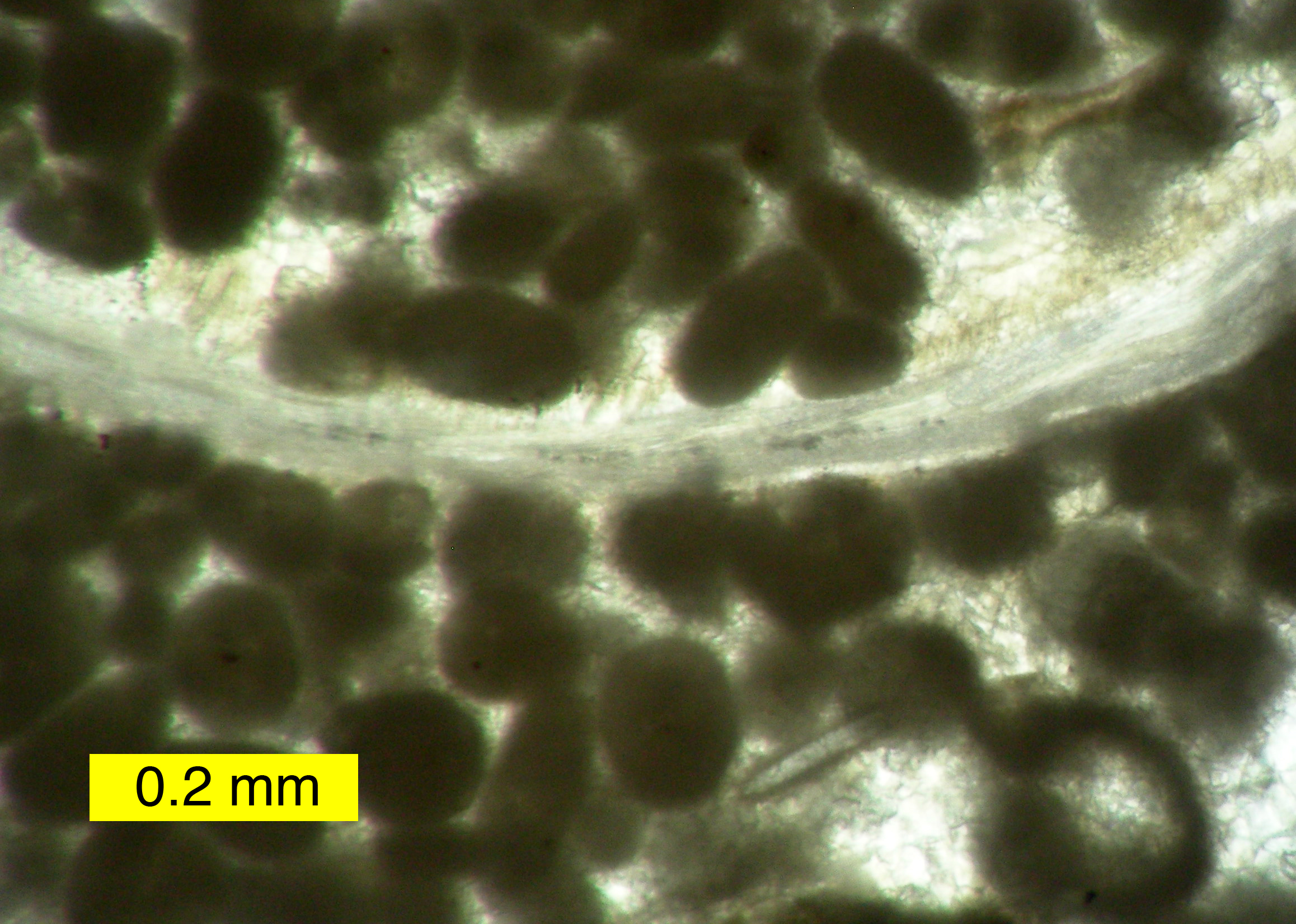
Pellets (a type of peloid) and a brachiopod shell visible in a limestone thin-section; Bird Spring Formation (Carboniferous) of southern Nevada.

Peloids are allochems that are composed of micrite, irrespective of size, shape, or origin. The two primary types of peloids are pellets and intraclasts. Another type of peloid is pseudo-oolith.
