= William R. Dickinson =

American geologist (1931–2015)

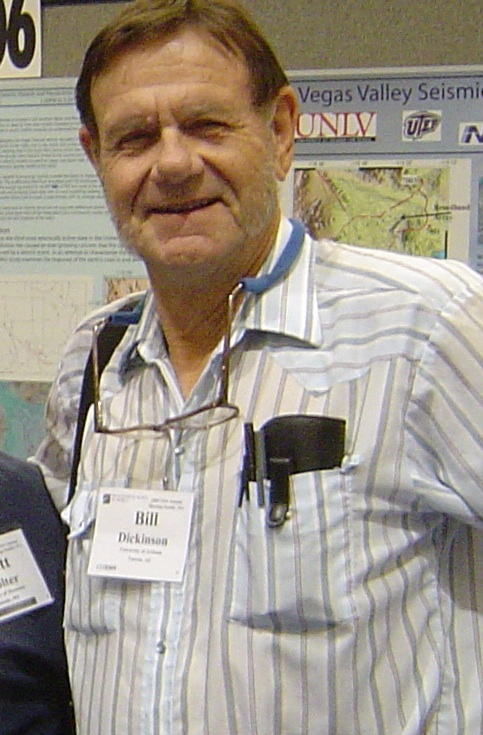
- Born: October 26, 1931; Tennessee
- Died: July 21, 2015; Nukuʻalofa
- Education: Stanford University
- Occupations: Geologist; archaeologist
- Employers: Stanford University (1958–); University of Arizona (1979–1991)
- Awards: Guggenheim Fellowship (1964); Penrose Medal (1991); William H. Twenhofel Medal (2000); Laurence L. Sloss Award (1999); Rip Rapp Archaeological Geology Award (2014)

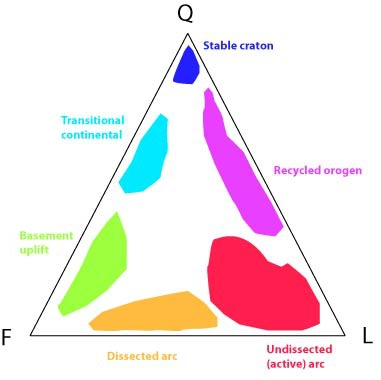
Dickinson's QFL triangle

William Richard Dickinson (October 26, 1931 – July 21, 2015) was a professor emeritus of geoscience at the University of Arizona and a member of the U.S. National Academy of Sciences. Dickinson was a professor at Stanford University and joined the U of A faculty in 1979.

== Early life ==
Dickinson was born near Nashville, Tennessee, on October 26, 1931, and grew up in Travellers Rest, a historic plantation house built by the slaves of his great-great-grandfather Judge John Overton in 1799. Dickinson enrolled at Stanford University in 1948, and graduated with a Bachelor's of Science in petroleum engineering in 1952 and a Ph.D in geology in 1958.

== Career ==
Dickinson was renowned for his work in plate tectonics, sedimentary geology and Pacific Oceana geology and was considered one of the foremost experts on the geology of the Colorado Plateau. Dickinson was one of the founders of the Gazzi-Dickinson Method and its primary application, QFL diagrams and their use in sandstone provenance.

Dickinson's research includes studying the potsherds (historic or prehistoric fragments of pottery) of Pacific Oceana. Over the years, he visited hundreds of Pacific Islands collecting and dating sherds.

== Awards ==
- 1991 - Penrose Medal by the Geological Society of America
- 2001 - William H. Twenhofel Medal by the Society for Sedimentary Geology
- 2014 - Rip Rapp Award for Archaeological Geology of the Geological Society of America

== Later life ==
In later life, Dickinson resided in Tucson, Arizona, where he continued to do research and teach at the University of Arizona. He died on July 21, 2015, while on a field expedition to Nuku'alofa, Tonga.
