= Robert L. Folk =

American geologist and petrologist

Robert "Bob" Louis "Luigi" Folk (September 30, 1925, Cleveland, Ohio – June 4, 2018) was an American geologist and petrologist, specializing in sedimentology, sandstone petrology, and carbonate petrology. He is known for the 1959 eponymous Folk classification of sedimentary rocks, which, with some minor modifications, is still in use today. He is one of the founders of what is sometimes called "Soft Rock Geology".

== Biography ==
Robert Louis Folk and his older brother, George Kinkead Folk, were the sons of George Billmyer Folk, a lawyer in Cleveland, and Majorie Kinkead Folk, a talented pianist and painter. After graduating from Shaker Heights High School, Robert L. Folk matriculated in 1943 at Pennsylvania State College (which in 1953 was renamed Pennsylvania State University). There he graduated in geology with a B.S. in 1946, an M.S. in 1950, and a Ph.D. in 1952. His Ph.D. thesis Petrography and petrology of the Lower Ordovician Beekmantown carbonate rocks in the vicinity of State College, Pennsylvania was supervised by Paul Dimitri Krynine (1902–1964). Folk married Marjorie Thomas in September 1946. In autumn 1951, Robert Folk, with his wife and son, moved to Houston, Texas, where he had employment as a sedimentary geology working for Gulf Oil Research. He was soon assigned to a field project in Pascagoula, Mississippi, where his second child, a daughter, was born. Folk was appointed in September 1952 as an assistant professor in the geology department of the University of Texas at Austin. There he was promoted to associate professor and then full professor, including the Professorship in Sedimentary Geology (1977–1982) and the Carlton Professorship of Geology (1982–1988). He retired in 1988 as professor emeritus. In 1988 he was employed as senior research scientist at the Bureau of Economic Geology, University of Texas at Austin. He was a visiting professor in 1965 at the Australian National University, in 1973 at the University of Milan, and in 1980 at Tongji University in Shanghai. As professor emeritus, he was extremely active in research until shortly before his death. Folk was the author or coauthor of more than 100 research papers. He with colleagues did fieldwork on beach pebbles in Tahiti, desert sands in central Australia, sandstones in Texas and West Virginia, limestones in Texas, Yucatán, and Italy. He was also involved in archeological geology in Yugoslavia, Israel, southern Italy, and Egypt.

His book Petrology of Sedimentary Rocks, based on his course notes for graduate students, first appeared in 1957, went through 6 editions, and was revised periodically until 1980.

In 1973 Robert Folk, with his wife and daughter, spent six months in Italy, where he was a visiting professor at the University of Milan, upon the invitation of Riccardo Assereto, who was a professor of geology there. From 1973 to 1988 Robert Folk spent every summer doing fieldwork in Italy. He and his family greatly enjoyed Italy, and he encouraged people to call him "Luigi". Folk had a variety of hobbies.

Robert and Marjorie Folk were married for 70 years and had two sons and a daughter. Robert Folk was predeceased by his wife and their two sons. Upon his death in 2018, he was survived by his daughter, four grandchildren, and two great-grandchildren.

== Disputed research on alleged nannobacteria ==
Folk believed that he had discovered, in the early 1990s, evidence of nannobacteria in rock from hot springs of Viterbo in the Lazio region of Italy. However, Folk's interpretation of his empirical discovery is generally rejected by experts in bacteriology.

== Awards and honors ==
Robert Folk received in 1989 the Neil Miner Award from the National Association of Geology Teachers (NAGT) and in 1997 the Distinguished Educator Medal from the American Association of Petroleum Geologists (AAPG). He was awarded the William H. Twenhofel Medal in 1979 from the Society Economic Paleontologists and Mineralogists (SEPM), now formally renamed the Society for Sedimentary Geology, the Sorby Medal in 1990 from the International Association of Sedimentologists, and the Penrose Medal in 2000 from Geological Society of America (GSA).

On May 22, 2001, the Board of Regents of the University of Texas (U.T.) established the R. L. Folk/E. F. McBride Petrography Fund to sponsor a rock sample identification contest held annually for U.T. geology students. Initial funds were provided by Rodger E. Denison (1932–2016), a geologist and U.T. alumnus.

== See also ==
- Neomorphism

== Selected publications ==
=== Articles ===
- Folk, R. L. (1951). "Stages of textural maturity in sedimentary rocks". Journal of Sedimentary Research. 21 (3): 127–130. Bibcode:1951JSedR..21..127F. doi:10.2110/jsr.21.127.
- Folk, Robert L. (1954). "The Distinction between Grain Size and Mineral Composition in Sedimentary-Rock Nomenclature". The Journal of Geology. 62 (4): 344–359. Bibcode:1954JG.....62..344F. doi:10.1086/626171.
- Folk, R. L.; Ward, W. C. (1957). "Brazos River bar [Texas]; a study in the significance of grain size parameters". Journal of Sedimentary Research. 27 (1): 3–26. Bibcode:1957JSedR..27....3F. doi:10.1306/74D70646-2B21-11D7-8648000102C1865D.
- Sneed, Edmund D.; Folk, Robert L. (1958). "Pebbles in the Lower Colorado River, Texas a Study in Particle Morphogenesis". The Journal of Geology. 66 (2): 114–150. Bibcode:1958JG.....66..114S. doi:10.1086/626490.
- Curtis C. Mason; Robert L. Folk (1958). "Differentiation of Beach, Dune, and Aeolian Flat Environments by Size Analysis, Mustang Island, Texas". SEPM Journal of Sedimentary Research. 28 (2): 211–226. doi:10.1306/74D707B3-2B21-11D7-8648000102C1865D.
- Robert L. Folk (1959). "Practical Petrographic Classification of Limestones". AAPG Bulletin. 43: 1–38. doi:10.1306/0BDA5C36-16BD-11D7-8645000102C1865D.
- Ham, William Eugene, ed. (1962). "Chapter. Spectral Subdivisions of Limestone Types by Robert L. Stock". Classification of Carbonate Rocks—A Symposium. American Association of Petroleum Engineers. Memoir1. Vol. 38. pp. 62–84. doi:10.1306/M1357. ISBN 978-1-6298-1236-6. LCCN 62020504.
- Folk, Robert L. (1966). "A Review of Grain-Size Parameters". Sedimentology. 6 (2): 73–93. Bibcode:1966Sedim...6...73F. doi:10.1111/j.1365-3091.1966.tb01572.x.
- Folk, R. L.; Andrews, Peter B.; Lewis, D. W. (1970). "Detrital sedimentary rock classification and nomenclature for use in New Zealand". New Zealand Journal of Geology and Geophysics. 13 (4): 937–968. Bibcode:1970NZJGG..13..937F. doi:10.1080/00288306.1970.10418211.
- James E. Dobkins, Jr.; Robert L. Folk (1970). "Shape Development on Tahiti-Nui". SEPM Journal of Sedimentary Research. 40 (4): 1167–1203. doi:10.1306/74D72162-2B21-11D7-8648000102C1865D.
- Robert l. Folk (1974). "The Natural History of Crystalline Calcium Carbonate: Effect of Magnesium Content and Salinity". SEPM Journal of Sedimentary Research. 44: 40–53. doi:10.1306/74D72973-2B21-11D7-8648000102C1865D.
- Robert L. Folk; Lynton S. Land (1975). "Mg/Ca Ratio and Salinity: Two Controls over Crystallization of Dolomite". AAPG Bulletin. 59: 60–68. doi:10.1306/83D91C0E-16C7-11D7-8645000102C1865D.
- Henry S. Chafetz; Robert L. Folk (1984). "Travertines: Depositional Morphology and the Bacterially Constructed Constituents". SEPM Journal of Sedimentary Research. 54: 289–316. doi:10.1306/212F8404-2B24-11D7-8648000102C1865D.
- Robert L. Folk (1993). "SEM Imaging of Bacteria and Nannobacteria in Carbonate Sediments and Rocks". SEPM Journal of Sedimentary Research. 63 (5): 990–999. doi:10.1306/D4267C67-2B26-11D7-8648000102C1865D.
- Folk, Robert L. (1999). "Nannobacteria and the precipitation of carbonate in unusual environments". Sedimentary Geology. 126 (1–4): 47–55. Bibcode:1999SedG..126...47F. doi:10.1016/S0037-0738(99)00031-7.
- Folk, Robert L.; Lynch, F. Leo (2001). "Organic matter, putative nannobacteria and the formation of ooids and hardgrounds". Sedimentology. 48 (2): 215–229. Bibcode:2001Sedim..48..215F. doi:10.1046/j.1365-3091.2001.00354.x.

=== Books and monographs ===
- Robert L. Folk; et al. (1961). Field excursion, Central Texas: bentonites, uranium-bearing rocks, vermiculites. University of Texas. Bureau of Economic Geology. Guidebook no. 3. LCCN 62063155. OCLC 1308747. Prepared for field excursions planned in conjunction with the tenth National Clay Conference, held in Austin, Texas, October 14–18, 1961; 53 pages, illustrated.
- Folk, Robert L. (1980). Petrology of sedimentary rocks (6th ed.). Austin, Texas: Hemphill Publishing Company. ISBN 0914696149. LCCN 80083557. pbk, illustrated. (previous editions: 1st, 1957; 2nd, 1959; 3rd, 1965; 4th, 1968; 5th, 1974) Author's Statement by Robert L. Folk: "Petrology of Sedimentary Rocks is out of stock and out of print, and it will not be revised or reprinted. As the owner of the copyright, I have given the Walter Geology Library permission to provide access to the entire document on the World-Wide-Web for those who might want to refer to it or download a copy for their own use."
- Petrology of Sedimentary Rocks. Hemphill Publishing Company. 1980. ISBN 978-0-914696-14-8 – via Walter Geology Library, University of Texas at Austin. ISBN 978-0-914696-14-8 (downloaded pdf copy of book)
