= Rock fragment =

Rock Fragment
- Sedimentary particle rock

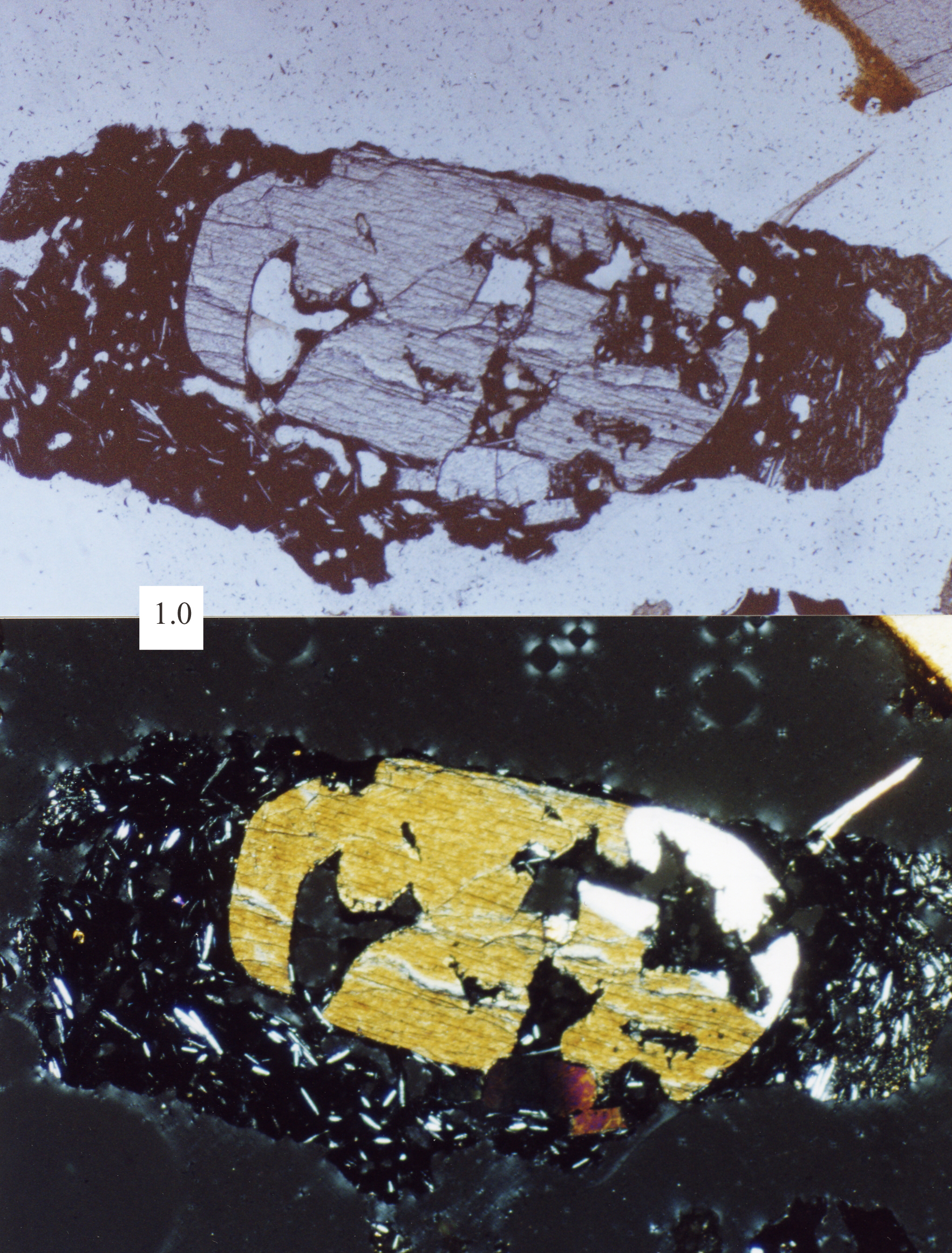
A sand grain that would be classified as a rock fragment. In this case, the rock fragment would be a volcanic rock fragment. Scale box in millimeters, plane-polarized light on top, cross-polarized light on bottom.

A rock fragment, in sedimentary geology, is a sand-sized particle or sand grain that is made up of multiple grains that are connected on the grain scale. These can include grains which are sand-sized themselves (a granitic rock fragment), or finer-grained materials (shale fragments). This definition is used for QFR ternary diagrams, provenance analysis, and in the Folk classification scheme, mainly in sandstones.

== See also ==
- Floaters
