= Christopher Anne Suczek =

Sedimentary geologist

- Born: September 6, 1942; Detroit, Michigan
- Died: April 10, 2014 (aged 71); Bellingham, Washington
- Education: University of California, Berkeley Stanford University
- Known for: Sedimentary Geologist Professor Emeritus, Western Washington University
- Scientific career
- Fields: Sedimentary petrology Plate Tectonics

Christopher Anne Suczek (September 6, 1942 – April 10, 2014) was a sedimentary geologist who specialized in sedimentary petrology and plate tectonics. She received her bachelor's degree from the University of California, Berkeley in 1972 and later went on to get her PhD in Geology from Stanford University in 1977. She is best known for her contribution in determining the correlation between sedimentary deposits and plate tectonics. By the 1980s the exploration of hydrocarbons and a continuation of tectonic studies in the Pacific Northwest area of the United States led to a need of increased knowledge of the Tertiary sedimentary basins and Suczek's mapping of the area.

== Professor ==
In her professional career, Suczek was a professor emeritus at Western Washington University for nearly 40 years. Some of the courses she taught were stratigraphy, sedimentation, physical and historical geography. Suczek also held a seat on the Auditing Committee for the Paleontological Society. Suczek was a known mentor to many of her students, especially her female students. She was known for always speaking her mind and leading the way for women in a field that is still underrepresented by females. Along with being a successful professor and sedimentary geologist, Suczek also had a son and a granddaughter. Suczek died on April 10, 2014, at age 71, at her home in Bellingham, after being ill for over a year with pancreatic cancer.

== Scientific work ==
Suczek's first major contribution to the scientific world of plate tectonics came in the form of her dissertation that she composed while completing her Ph.D. at Stanford University (1977). In her dissertation, she studied the Upper Cambrian Harmony Formation in Northern Nevada, in an intent to prove if any of the plate tectonic models could be accurate.

Throughout her study, Suczek develops two models in an attempt to describe plate tectonic behaviour in connection with the Upper Cambrian Harmony Formation. Out of these two models Suczek found evidence to believe that the passive continental margin model seemed to be most likely as it lasted until the end of Cambrian time and a time constraint of 650 million years of spreading event are met. A lack of volcanic ash can also be accounted for with the passive continental margin model. Suczek does note that some problems remain even with this model such as the nature of crust under the miogeocline and the continued finding of almost pure quartzite in the eugeocline.

Suczek herself notes that further study to find comparisons between the harmony foundation, Northern Sierra, Klamath Mountains, Shoofly Moffett Creek and Antelope Mountain could lead to more evidence supporting this model.

== Publication ==
In 1983, Suczek published a journal article on Disaggregation of quartzites in the Journal of Sedimentary Petrology. She explained that the common method of analyzing grain sizes was through sieving and that this method was very time-consuming and the results are not accurate (apart from the median and graphic means). Instead, she proposed and described a method where the cement is dissolved by hydrofluoric acid to isolate the quartzites. She built this off of a model developed by Pessagno and Newport. Her method is more efficient as the immersion is only 30 minutes long.

Suczek worked with Raymond V. Ingersoll (from the Department of Earth and Space Science at the University of California) in 1985 to publish their work in the Journal of Sedimentary Research on Petrology and provenance of Cenozoic sand from the Indus Cone and the Arabian Basin. The article describes the uplifted gneissic, sedimentary and metasedimentary terrane of the western Himalayas that was produced by the closing of the ocean between India and Asia. They were trying to test if the sand from the Arabian Basin was derived from the Himalayas to find out what petrographic characteristics were present. They then compared samples with the sand from the Bengal and Nicobar Fans. This comparison would help explain tectonic movements in the region from convergence and collision of India and Asia causing the Himalayan orogenic belt. In order to do this, they used samples from three of the Deep Sea Drilling Project's holes, counting the layers to find the Cenozoic sand.

Using their findings, they compared results with other petrological data. Part of the discussion includes references to Suczek's previous work with others where they were attempting to find data to differentiate sand weathered off orogenic belts created by continental collision. The new data they found strongly suggests that parts of the samples show characteristics of the sands derived from collision zones as opposed to Atlantic-type margins. There is a reference to papers she collaborated on in 1979 where triangular diagrams were used to differentiate sands of different tectonic provenance. However, in the paper six years later they decided to use the QpLvmLsm plot instead of as it visibly illustrates their sands as part of the group of sands derived from continental collisions and distinct from other groups.

Finally, the conclusion explains that two out of the three Deep Sea Drilling Project samples were derived from the Himalayas and the third sample was a combination of Himalayan and Arabian sources. Also, the Arabian Sea samples matched the sand samples from the Bengal and Nicobar Fans.

== Paleogeographic evolution paper ==
In 1986 and then revised in 1987, Suczek along with Paul Heller and Rowland Tabor published their paper on paleogeographic evolution of the United States Pacific Northwest during Paleogene Time in the Canadian Journal of Earth Sciences. This work was to brief the paleogeographic history of the area during Paleogene times. To do this Suczek, Heller and Tabor looked at igneous, sedimentary and deformational histories which then allowed them to create a series of paleogeographic maps. This study resulted in the description of three main phases of Paleogene basin evolution.

The first phase consisted of formation due to the collision of oceanic islands which occurred along the continental margin. Sediments found in this phase were created from orogenic highlands. The second phase had formed within a broad forearc region and was marked by rapid subsidence of individual basins. Due to extension, maybe in conjunction with transcurrent faulting, nonmarine basins had formed. Found in both the marine and nonmarine basins were rapid sedimentation that was made up of sandstone from cretaceous plutonic sources far to the east. The third and final phase was marked by the growing Cascade volcanic arc which had begun in early Oligocene times. This growth in the volcanic arc caused changes to the basin makeup. The Cascade Range would divert streams carrying eastern derived material, reduce sedimentation rates in the coastal basins and provide a local source of volcanic detritus.
