= Emigrant Springs Formation =

Geologic formation in Nevada, United States

- Stratigraphic range: Middle Cambrian–Upper Cambrian
- Type: Formation
- Sub-units: See: Members
- Underlies: Dunderberg Formation
- Overlies: Patterson Pass Shale

Lithology
- Primary: Calcisiltite
- Other: Mudstone, Calcilutite, Calcarenite

Location
- Region: Nevada
- Country: United States

The Emigrant Springs Formation (Also known as the Emigrant Springs Limestone) is a geologic formation in Nevada. It preserves fossils dating back to the Cambrian period.

== Geology ==
The Emigrant Springs Formation is predominately composed of various carbonate rocks, and is overlain by the Dunderberg Formation, whilst it is underlain by the Patterson Pass Shale. It also contains three members, which are as follows, in ascending stratigraphic order (lowest to highest):

=== Members ===
- Member A: This member is the thinnest, only getting up to 256 ft (78 m) thick, and is composed of medium-gray, thin to medium-bedded calcisiltite and calcilutite, with breccia's in the upper beds of the member.
- Member B: This member is the thickest, getting up to 1,509 ft (460 m) thick, and is dominated by light-olive-gray, yellowish or pink calcisiltite, which contains silt-sized quartz grains. At the base of this member, there are also mudstones present, transitioning to medium-light-gray, thin to thick-bedded calcisiltite and calcilutite above.
- Member C: This member can get up to 495 ft (151 m) thick, and is primarily composed of medium-gray oolitic calcarenite, calcilutite and calcisiltite.

== Paleobiota ==
The Emigrant Springs Formation contains a small number of trilobites, and a collection of conodonts, and various molluscs.

| Color key: Taxon / Reclassified taxon / Taxon falsely reported as present / Dubious taxon or junior synonym / Ichnotaxon / Ootaxon / Morphotaxon | Notes; Uncertain or tentative taxa are in small text; ~~crossed out~~ taxa are discredited. |

=== Arthropoda ===
Arthropoda
| Genus | Species | Notes | Images |
|---|---|---|---|
| Coosina | Coosina sp. | Ptychoparid trilobite. | |
| Blountia | Blountia sp. | Ptychoparid trilobite. | |
| Crepicephalus | Crepicephalus sp. | Ptychoparid trilobite. | |
| Tricrepicephalus | Crepicephalus sp. | Ptychoparid trilobite. | |
| Pemphigaspis | Pemphigaspis sp. | Ptychoparid trilobite. | |
| Elrathia | E. alapyge | Ptychoparid trilobite. | |
| Cedaria (?) | Cedaria (?) sp. | Ptychoparid trilobite. | |
| Meteoraspis (?) | Meteoraspis (?) sp. | Ptychoparid trilobite. | |
| Baltagnostus | Baltagnostus sp.; B. eurypyx | Diplagnostid agnostid. | |
| Hypagnostus | Hypagnostus sp. | Diplagnostid agnostid. | |
| Pseudagnostus | Pseudagnostus sp. | Agnostid trilobite. | |
| Utagnostus | U. trispinulus | Agnostid trilobite. | |
| Kymagnostus (?) | Kymagnostus (?) sp. | Agnostid trilobite. | |
| Lejopyge | L. calva | Ptychagnostid agnostid. | |
| Ptychagnostus | Ptychagnostus sp.; P. aculeatus | Ptychagnostid agnostid. | |
| Glaphyraspis | Glaphyraspis sp. | Trilobite. | |
| Cheliacephalus | Cheliacephalus sp. | Trilobite. | |
| Aphelaspis | Aphelaspis sp. | Trilobite. | |

=== Chordata ===
| Genus | Species | Notes | Images |
|---|---|---|---|
| Hertzina | H. bisulcata | Furnishinid paraconodont. | |
| Westergaardodina | W. muelleri | Westergaardodinid paraconodont. | |
| Furnishina | F. asymmetrica; F. furnishi; F. bicarinata | Furnishinid paraconodont. | |
| Distacodus | D. palmeri | Distacodontid conodont. | |
| Oneotodus | O. tenuis | Protopanderodontid tenuis. | |

=== Lophotrochozoa ===
| Genus | Species | Notes | Images |
|---|---|---|---|
| Helcionella | Helcionella sp. | Helcionellid mollusc. | |
| Scenella (?) | Scenella (?) sp. | Scenellid mollusc. | |
| Canthylotreta | C. crista | Acrotretid brachiopod. | |
| Lingulella | Lingulella sp. | Obolid brachiopod. | |
| Livnarssonia | L. ophirensis | Brachiopod. | |
| Paterina | Paterina sp. | Brachiopod. | |

== See also ==
- List of fossiliferous stratigraphic units in Nevada
- Paleontology in Nevada
