= Bass Canyon =

Submarine canyon off the coast of Lakes Entrance, Victoria

Coordinates: 38.70°S 149.20°E

- Submarine canyon
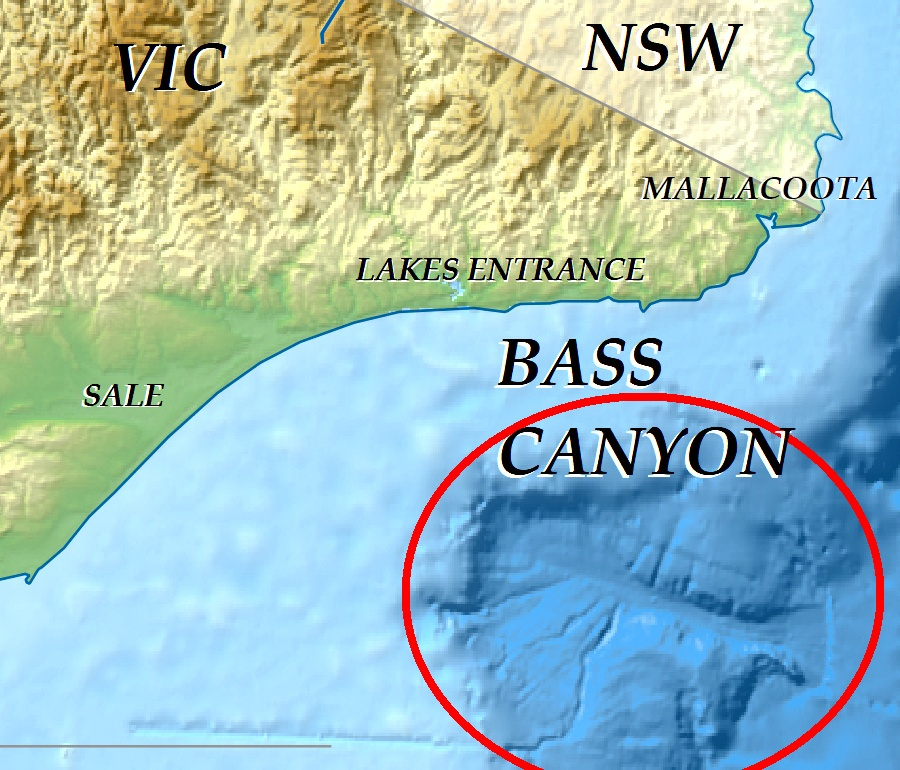
- The canyon is located just southeast of Victoria’s coast
- Interactive map of Bass Canyon
- Location: Bass Strait, Tasman Sea
- Age: Late Pliocene

Area
  - Total: 250,000 hectares (620,000 acres)

Dimensions
  - Length: 80 kilometres (50 mi)
  - Width: 10 kilometres (6.2 mi)

Bass Canyon is a submarine canyon located on the edge of the continental shelf off the coast of eastern Victoria, Australia, within Bass Strait, approximately 90 kilometres (56 mi) southeast of Ninety Mile Beach, Lakes Entrance. The canyon descends to depths exceeding 3,000 metres (9,800 ft), making it one of the deepest submarine canyons off the Australian coast, one of the largest in the world, and among the most impressive modern submarine canyon systems. The exact age of the canyon is debatable as the precise timing of its formation remains uncertain.

Bass Canyon, together with its largest tributary, Everard Canyon, was initially documented in 1968 on the basis of bathymetric soundings collected by the Royal Australian Navy Hydrographic Office. The earliest modern sediment samples from Bass Canyon were documented by Schneider (1985) and Colwell et al. (1987), based on a small set of cores and dredged material. Although temperatures in the canyon hover just above freezing, it still sustains a remarkable diversity of rarely observed organisms, including deep sea fish. To the east, the Tasman Basin is revealed within the Bass Canyon and along the continental shelf margin.

== Description ==
Bass Canyon is a long, relatively narrow submarine feature, extending for approximately 80 kilometres (50 mi) and averaging about 10 kilometres (6.2 mi) in width. It has a broadly linear planform, trends to the southeast, and is characterised by a flat floor situated at depths of roughly 3,000–4,000 metres (9,800–13,100 ft) within the Gippsland Basin. At its upper reaches, around 3,000 metres (9,800 ft) water depth, the canyon is fed by a network of tributaries, including five channels that cut across the Australian continental shelf and three additional tributaries confined to the continental slope. The canyon floor is composed of unconsolidated recent quartz sand, silts and mud with a mild slope.

The canyon extends for roughly 160 kilometres (99 mi) and includes a broad, relatively level floor measuring about 65 kilometres (40 mi) in length and between 3 kilometres (1.9 mi) and 8 kilometres (5.0 mi) in width, bordered by walls rising to heights of around 1.2 kilometres (0.75 mi). It occupies the central, deeper part of the continental slope depression situated offshore from the main shelf graben. To the south, Flinders Canyon is comparatively narrow and steep-sided, with a gorge-like morphology, two main tributaries, and a total length of about 95 kilometres (59 mi), reaching depths of approximately 3.8 kilometres (2.4 mi). Over half of the canyons cutting into the shelf are situated in the southeast, including the extensive dendritic Bass Canyon system, which is made up of six tributary canyons: Everard, Anemone, Archer, Pisces, Moray, and Mudskipper.

Five tributary canyons, which cut across the shelf, merge on the lower slope at around 3,000 metres (9,800 ft) in depth and are subsequently funneled into the extensive deep-water Bass Canyon, which extends southeast for approximately 80 kilometres (260,000 ft) to the Tasman Abyssal Plain. Despite its prominence, the age and developmental history of the Bass Canyon remain poorly understood. Similarly, ancient infilled canyons are sparsely documented, leaving limited knowledge of their development and significance along paleocontinental margins. The bathymetric features strongly suggest that fluids are seeping into the Bass Canyon floor at roughly 30 locations.

== Geology ==
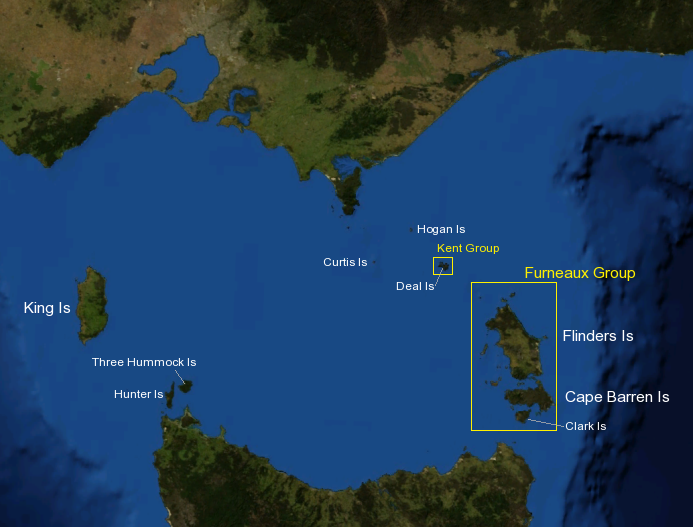
The canyon, visible just northeast of Flinders Island

Five major shelf-incising tributaries and three tributaries confined to the continental slope merge on the lower slope and feed into the main deep-water Bass Canyon at depths of around 3,000 metres (9,800 ft). Typical slope deposits are dominated by sandy calcilutite and muddy calcarenite, interpreted respectively as products of mud flows and mud-rich sandy debris flows, together with hemipelagic foraminiferal calcilutite. Sediments at the canyon head are characterised by intraclast-rich calcarenite and calcirudite, likely emplaced by mass-wasting processes, as well as fine calcarenite attributed to cohesionless sandy debris flows. The primary Gippsland Basin depocentre exhibits three prominent, straight gullies, each about 50 metres (160 ft) deep, along the north wall of the Bass Canyon, as revealed by seismic and bathymetric data. Magnetic data suggest that the basement to the east of the canyon is likely composed of Permo-Triassic rocks.

Sediments infilling the canyon are dominated by well-sorted fine calcarenite, interpreted as the product of prolonged, semi-continuous cohesionless sandy debris flows, with less frequent layers of intraclast-rich mud attributed to cohesive sediment gravity flows. Two distinct morphologies of tributary canyons can be identified: narrow, steep-sided V-shaped canyons, with wall gradients reaching up to about 35°, which are clearly expressed in backscatter imagery; and wider U-shaped canyons with gentler walls of 10° or less that are less sharply defined in backscatter data. Approximately 30 subcircular, crater-like features, interpreted as vents, occur on the floor of the Bass Canyon at a depth of around 4 kilometres (13,000 ft), which seem to follow faults that traverse the Golden Beach, Cobia, and Halibut subgroups.

Gutters carved into the canyon floor contain unconsolidated fine to medium sand. Superimposed on this slope are roughly 30 subcircular depressions, each about 500 metres (1,600 ft) in diameter. Many are simple topographic lows ranging from 10–50 metres (33–164 ft), while some exhibit crater-like rims that rise above the surrounding sand. Several appear to align with features interpreted as faults in the underlying basement. The eastern portion of the lower Bass Canyon and the adjacent southern area host Santonian-age sedimentary rocks, equivalent to the Golden Beach Subgroup. Dredged samples consist of lignitic clay, sandstone, and lignite, likely originating from a coastal or swampy environment. Seismic data reveal a rapid thinning of the sequence north of the Bass Canyon.

Within the Bass Canyon, the carbonates and fine clastic sediments are somewhat more lithified, forming structural benches at depths shallower than approximately 2,600 metres (8,500 ft). Dredging immediately south of the Bass Canyon mouth revealed the presence of a basaltic volcanic center. These branching heads capture coarse material from the continental shelf, driving strongly erosive gravity flows that carve deep V-shaped canyon forms. As canyon heads become more stable, the supply of erosive, shelf-derived sediment diminishes, and canyon cross-sections transition from V-shaped to broader U-shaped profiles. This transformation is further promoted by ongoing pelagic sedimentation and gravity flows sourced from the surrounding slope and canyon walls. On the lower slope, sand-rich debris flows lacking significant mud content merge with sandy discharges from tributary canyons and continue downslope along the Bass Canyon floor. Sediment cores recovered from the canyon floor record cyclical variations in magnetic susceptibility, preserved within these sandy deposits.

=== Formation ===
The present-day Bass Canyon ranks among the largest submarine canyon systems in the world that is entirely developed within a cool-water carbonate setting. Bass Canyon is formed by at least three principal tributary channels that originate at depths of approximately 110–165 metres (361–541 ft). Although the age of the canyon is problematic, erosional features that extend across the present shelf edge have been dated to the late Pliocene. Subsurface evidence indicates that older canyon systems are preserved within sediments of the Seaspray Group, with examples occurring from the late Oligocene onward and becoming particularly widespread from the Middle Miocene through to the present. The Tuna and Marlin channels feed into the Bass Canyon, indicating that the canyon may have existed in some form as far back as the Eocene. Some, such as Hill et al. (1998), have proposed that it could date back to the Tasman Sea breakup event, around 80 Ma. The tributary canyons may have originated through downslope erosion by sediment gravity flows initiated at the shelf edge, progressively evolving into dendritic canyon-head systems.

A faulting event likely occurred around 22 Ma, roughly coinciding with the Thorpdale Volcanics in the Gippsland area of eastern Victoria. When the proto-Bass Canyon cut through the carbonate shelf, streams and currents likely eroded the poorly consolidated sands of the lower Seaspray and Latrobe Groups at a rapid pace. This process would have triggered significant rejuvenation of streams throughout much of the Gippsland Basin, now recorded as the prominent channeling event responsible for eroding the Middle Miocene marker. The associated uplift may have contributed to the channel development observed at the mid-Miocene marker. It is possible that the hydraulic instability linked to this event further eroded the weakly consolidated and faulted Palaeogene and Upper Cretaceous sediments, shaping the Bass Canyon into a form close to its present configuration. Seismic studies of the offshore Gippsland Basin exhibit intricate canyon-fill forms from the Early Oligocene and suggest that the geometry and scale of the Bass Canyon system have been partially shaped by precursor Pliocene canyon systems.

== Exploration ==
During its 2025 voyage from its home port of Hobart, the CSIRO research vessel Investigator surveyed the submarine canyon using integrated multibeam sonar mapping and visual imaging techniques. The expedition provided 21 postgraduate students from 16 universities with hands-on experience of life aboard a research vessel and the chance to operate scientific equipment. During the cruise, the research vessel Investigator carried out research activities within Bass Canyon as well as in the Southern Ocean, to the south of Tasmania.

Deep sea organisms found during the voyage of the canyon include; Bathysaurus mollis, Bathypterois grallat, Acanthonus armatus, Halieutaea, Squalus, Ateleopodidae, Chimaeridae, Crinoidea, Grimpoteuthis and Halosaur, among a few others. Most of the foraminiferal assemblages in the contemporary Bass Canyon are composed of widespread, cosmopolitan species, with only a small number of semi-endemic taxa, which are largely confined to the shelf. The modern deep-water species tend to be more conservative, having evolved in relatively stable, nutrient-rich (eutrophic) environments compared with their shallow-water counterparts that inhabit nutrient-poor (oligotrophic) settings. Relict foraminifera are restricted to shelfal depths, shallower than 145 kilometres (90 mi).

In 2019, Viridien, formerly Compagnie Générale de Géophysique Services, carried out a multi-client 3D marine seismic survey (MSS) in the Gippsland Basin, offshore Victoria. The survey aims to collect seismic data across the area stretching from Ninety Mile Beach to the Bass Canyon.

== See also ==
- Tasman Abyssal Plain
