= Miria Formation =

Geologic formation of Western Australia

- Stratigraphic range: Maastrichtian; ~70.6–66 Ma
- Type: Geological formation
- Underlies: Unconformity with Boongerooda Greensand
- Overlies: Korojon Calcarenite
- Thickness: Up to 2.1 m (6.9 ft)

Lithology
- Primary: Calcarenite, sandstone, marl
- Other: Siltstone, limestone

Location
- Coordinates: 22.6°S 114.3°E
- Approximate paleocoordinates: 49.8°S 100.6°E
- Region: Western Australia
- Country: Australia
- Extent: Carnarvon Basin
- Miria Formation (Australia)

The Miria Formation is a Late Cretaceous geologic formation, in Western Australia.

Possible indeterminate theropod remains have been recovered from it, as well as those of sea turtles, and possible azhdarchid pterosaurs. The lithology of the unit consists of calcarenite with abundant phosphatic nodules. The formation is a layer between 0.6 and 2.1 metres in thickness, a surface deposited during the end of the Cretaceous in the late Maastrichtian period around sixty five million years ago. The composition is foraminiferal calcisiltite and calcarenite and is rich in macrofossils of a diverse range of species. The specimens of ammonites date the Miria Marl of the Giralia Anticline layer to a period of formation at a major extinction event in the Cretaceous. The formation shows the K/T boundary very distinctly, and is the only place on the Australian continent to present the globally correlated phenomenon.

The site contains fossil remains of the ammonites that were widely dispersed across the globe in the Cretaceous and that confidently date the stratigraphy of the formation across the greatest known mass extinction event. The Miria Marl layer has revealed highly diverse fossil deposits of shark teeth and coral species that are also found in the former Gondwanan land masses in southern India and the Antarctic.
