= Loch Neaty =

Lake in Highland, Scotland, UK

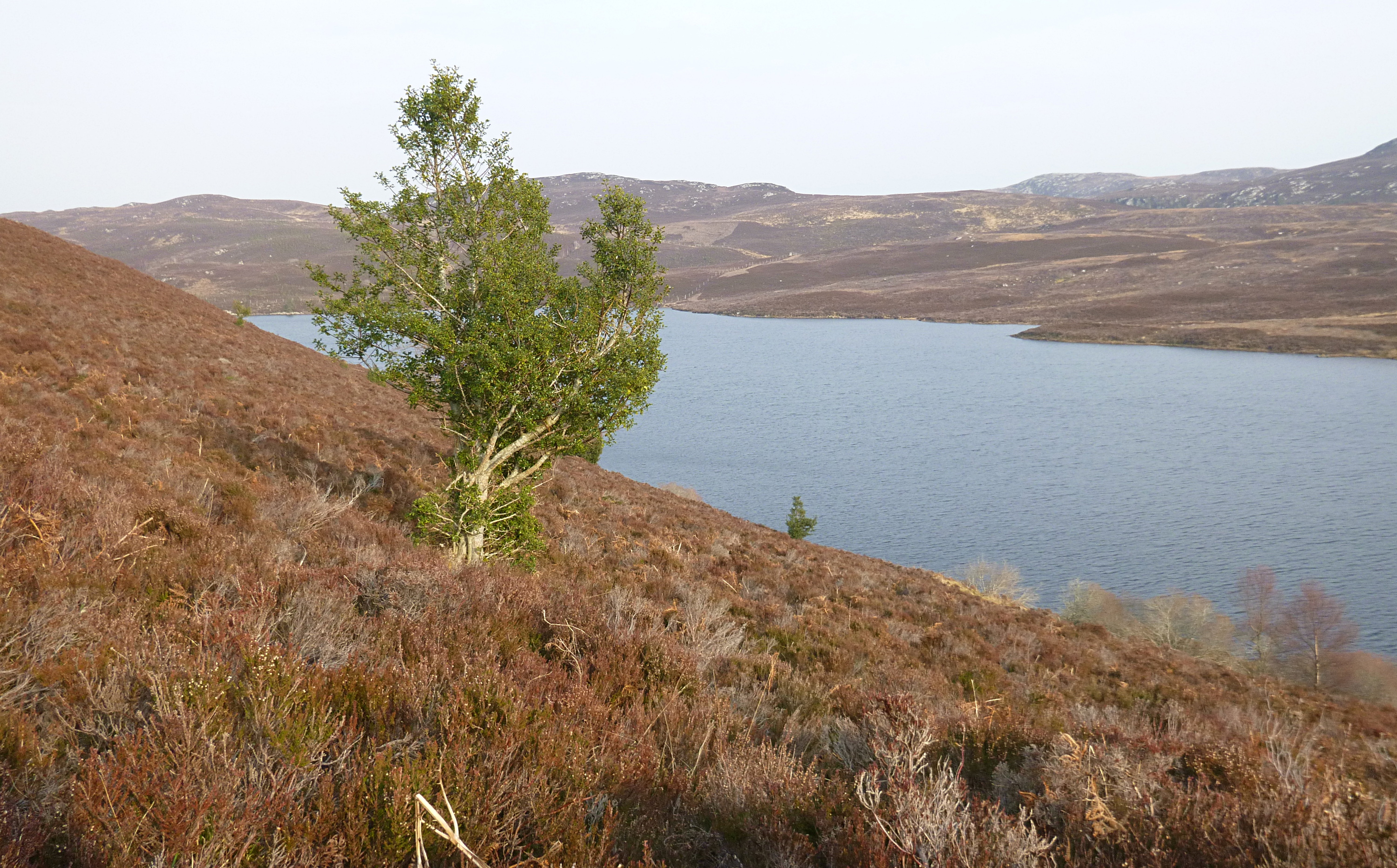
- Loch Neaty from its western shore

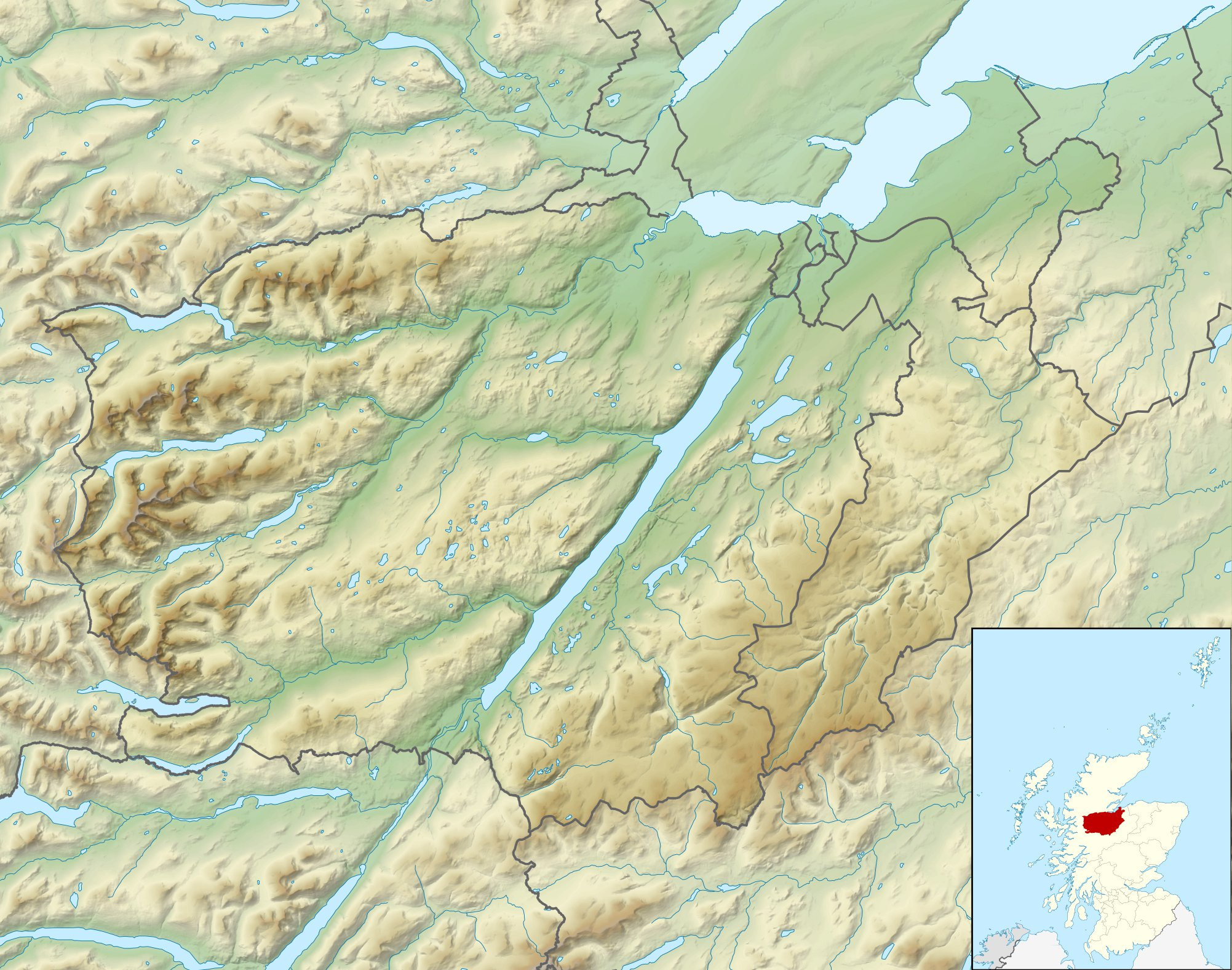
- Location within Inverness area
- Location: Scottish Highlands
- Coordinates: 57°23′39″N 4°36′32″W
- Primary inflows: Loch Garbh Iolachan
- Primary outflows: Allt Garbh
- Basin countries: Scotland, United Kingdom
- Max. length: 939.5 m (3,082 ft)
- Max. width: 417.30 m (1,369.1 ft)
- Surface elevation: 256 m (840 ft)

Loch Neaty is a remote mountain loch in Inverness-shire, Scotland, just 900m west of the much larger Loch Bruicheach.

The loch's name is of uncertain origin. It may be a corruption of the Old Norse naut, meaning "cattle" i.e. "Loch of the Cow", or of the Scottish Gaelic neimhidh, meaning nemeton. "Neaty" is also the name of the hill on the loch's northern shore, Leachd Neaty.

Loch Neaty sits among glacial drift, over a bedrock of psammite. A small sluice dam guards the primary outflow on its northeast shore.

A 1997 archaeological survey noted a small shieling just south of the loch, beside one of its smaller tributaries.
