= Lutite =

Old terminology for clayey sedimentary rock

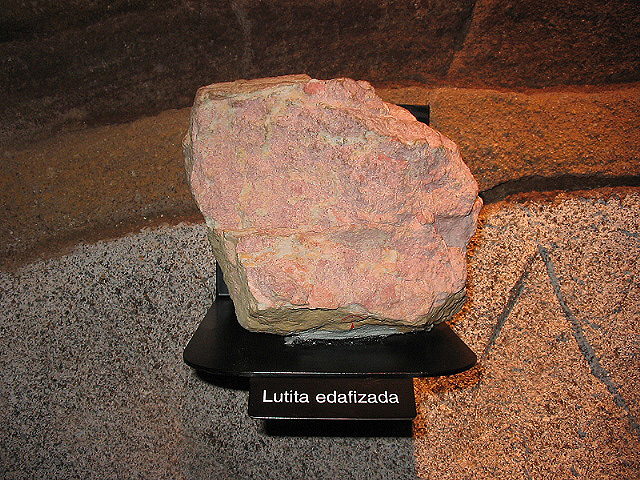

Lutite is old terminology, which is not widely used, by Earth scientists in field descriptions for fine-grained, sedimentary rocks, which are composed of silt-size sediment, clay-size sediment, or a mixture of both. When mixed with water lutites often disintegrate into mud. Because this is a field term, there is a lack of any precise definition for it based upon specific grain-size characteristics. Lutites include a variety of fine-grained sedimentary rocks, including calcisiltite, calcilutite, claystone, mudstone, shale, and siltstone. It is equivalent to the term mudstone and the Greek-derived term pelite. Lutite was first used in 1904 by Grabau, who derived it from lutum, the Latin word for mud. He also proposed a number of prefixes to be used with and attached to "lutite" in order to designate various types of lutites. None of these prefixes are used by Earth scientists nowadays.

Pettijohn gives the following descriptive terms based on grain size, avoiding the use of terms such as "clay" or "argillaceous" which carry an implication of chemical composition:

Descriptive size terms
Texture	Common	Greek	Latin
Coarse	gravel(ly)	psephite (psephitic)	rudite (rudaceous)
Medium	sand(y)	psammite (psammitic)	arenite (arenaceous)
Fine	clay(ey)	pelite (pelitic)	lutite (lutaceous)
