= Glen Kingie =

Valley in the Northwest Highlands of Scotland

Coordinates: 57.031°N 5.240°W

Glen Kingie is a glen or valley in the Northwest Highlands of Scotland which opens onto Glen Garry at its north-eastern end at Kingie. It is drained by the River Kingie which rises at a 650m col between the peaks of An Eag and Sgurr Cos na Breachd-laoidh. The river is fed by numerous burns both to north and south, key amongst which are Allt a' Chinn Bhric, Allt a' Choire Ghlais, Allt Coir' an Stangain Mhoir, Allt a' ùRiabhaich and Allt Torrain Dharaich. The waters of the Kingie enter those of the River Garry at Kingie Pool. Much of the northern side of the glen is formed by the slopes of 1003m high mountain of Sgurr Mor and the 919m high Gairich, both of which are Munros. The more broken southern side is dominated, at least in its upper reaches, by three (Corbetts; the 835m high Sgurr Cos na Breachd-laoidh, the 858m Fraoch Bheinn and the 880m Sgurr Mhurlagain. The glen runs through territory formed by psammites and pelites of the late Precambrian Glenfinnan Group of the Loch Ness Supergroup, a thick sequence of metamorphosed rocks which is intruded by the West Highland Granite Gneiss in the middle section of the glen.

There are no public roads within the glen though a private vehicle track extends through the plantation from Glen Garry. An old right of way continues westwards from near the head of this track. Much of the lower part of the glen is planted up as a commercial forestry plantation, contiguous with plantations in Glen Garry.
