= Rudite =

Type of sedimentary rock

Rudite is a general name used for a sedimentary rock composed of rounded or angular detrital grains, i.e. granules, pebbles, cobbles, and boulders, which are coarser than sand in size. Rudites include sedimentary rocks composed of both siliciclastic, i.e. conglomerate and breccia, and carbonate grains, i.e. calcirudite and rudstone. This term is equivalent to the Greek-derived term, psephite. Rudite was initially proposed by Grabau as "rudyte". It is derived from the Latin word rudus for "crushed stone", "rubbish", "debris", and "rubble".

Rudites can be deposited in a variety of nonmarine and marine environments. In nonmarine settings, gravels, which later were lithified to become rudites, accumulated within fluvial channels, within alluvial fans, and as glacial deposits. In marine environments, rudites were deposited along shorelines as part of beaches, as basal conglomerates during marine transgressions, and in the deep sea by slumps and turbidites. Rudites composed largely of rounded siliciclastic gravel are conglomerates and others composed of angular siliciclastic gravel are breccias.

Pettijohn gives the following descriptive terms based on grain size, avoiding the use of terms such as clay or argillaceous which carry an implication of chemical composition. The Greek terms are more commonly used for metamorphosed rocks, and the Latin for unmetamorphosed:

Descriptive size terms
Texture	Common	Greek	Latin
Coarse	gravel(ly)	psephite (psephitic)	rudite (rudaceous)
Medium	sand(y)	psammite (psammitic)	arenite (arenaceous)
Fine	clay(ey)	pelite (pelitic)	lutite (lutaceous)
