= Pellets (petrology) =

Form of carbonate sedimentary structure

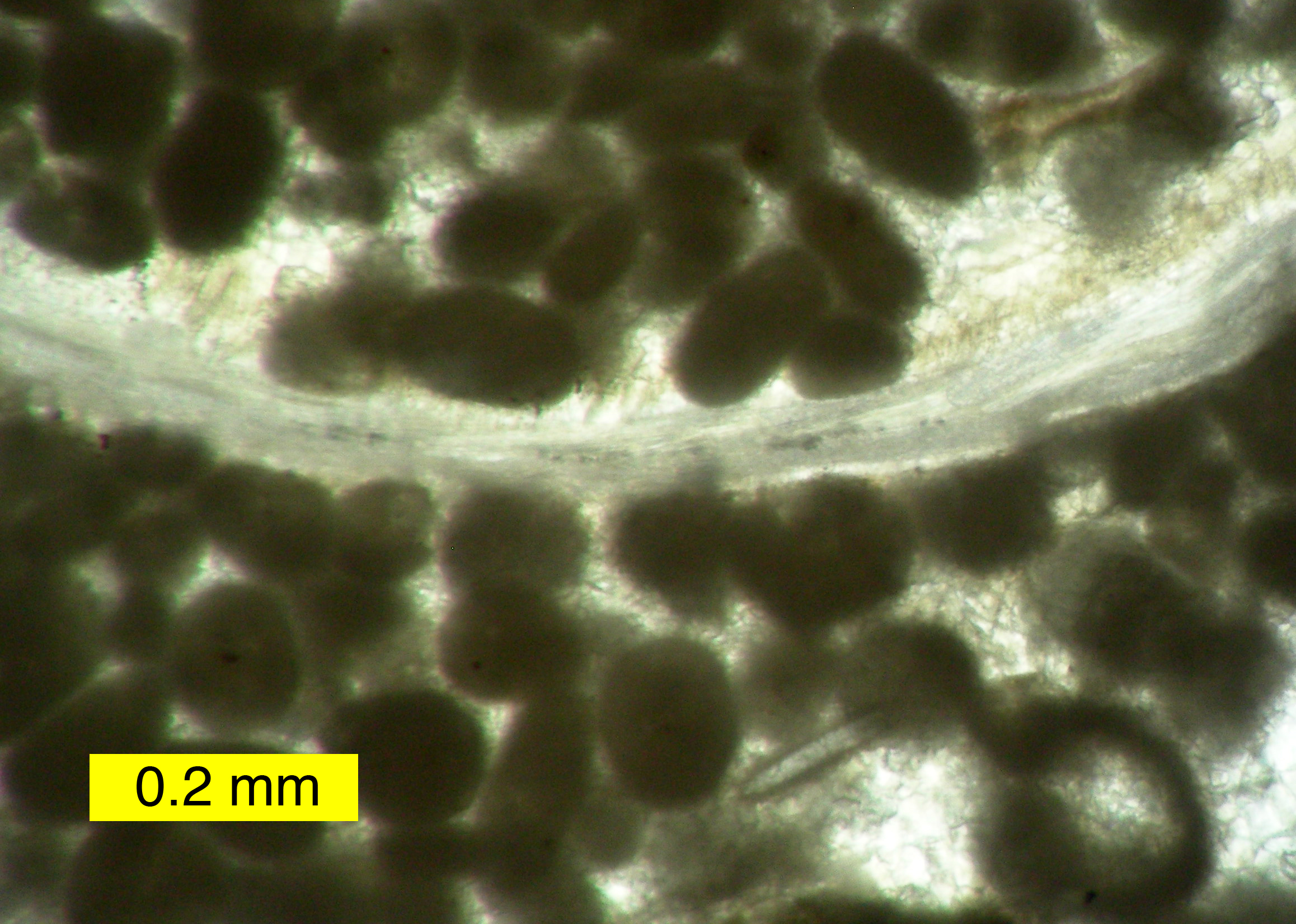
Pellets and a brachiopod shell visible in a limestone thin-section; Bird Spring Formation (Carboniferous) of southern Nevada.

Pellets are small spherical to ovoid or rod-shaped grains that are common component of many limestones. They are typically 0.03 to 0.3 mm long and composed of carbonate mud (micrite). Their most common size is 0.04 to 0.08 mm. Pellets typically lack any internal structure and are remarkably uniform in size and shape in any single limestone sample. They consist either of aggregated carbonate mud, precipitated calcium carbonate, or a mixture of both. They either are or were composed either of aragonite, calcite, or a mixture of both. Also, pellets composed of either glauconite or phosphorite are common in marine sedimentary rocks. Pellets occur in Precambrian through Phanerozoic strata. They are an important component mainly in Phanerozoic strata. The consensus among sedimentologists and petrographers is that pellets are the fecal products of invertebrate organisms because of their constant size, shape, and extra-high content of organic matter.

Pellets differ from oolites and intraclasts, which are also found in limestones. They differ from oolites in that pellets lack the radial or concentric structures that characterize oolites. They differ from intraclasts in that pellets lack the complex internal structure, which is typical of intraclasts. In addition, pellets, quite unlike intraclasts, are characterized by a remarkable uniformity of shape, extremely good sorting, and small size.

By definition, pellets differ from peloids, in that pellets have a specific size, shape, and implied origin—while peloids vary widely in size, shape, and origin. Pellets, in the strict sense, are fecal products of invertebrate organisms. Peloids are allochems of any size, structure, or origin. As a result, peloids not only include possible pellets, but also include a variety of other distinctly non-pellet grains—such as indistinct intraclasts, micritized ooids, or fossil fragments. In addition, some peloids are even microbial or inorganic precipitates. Carbonate geologists consider the vast majority of peloids as secondary allochems created by biological degradation or “micritization” of other primary carbonate grains, i.e., ooids, bioclasts, or pellets.

== See also ==
- Calcilutite
- Calcarenite
- Calcisiltite
