= Psephite =

Sediment or sedimentary rock

Psephite (Greek: psephos, "pebble") is either a sediment or sedimentary rock composed of fragments that are coarser than sand and which are enclosed in a matrix that varies in kind and amount. It is equivalent to a rudite. Shingle, gravel, breccia, and especially conglomerate, would all be considered psephites. It is equivalent to the Latin-derived term rudite. Psephite is more commonly used for a metamorphosed rudite.

Pettijohn gives the following descriptive terms based on grain size, avoiding the use of terms such as "clay" or "argillaceous", which carry an implication of chemical composition:

Descriptive size terms
Texture	Common	Greek	Latin
Coarse	gravel(ly)	psephite (psephitic)	rudite (rudaceous)
Medium	sand(y)	psammite (psammitic)	arenite (arenaceous)
Fine	clay(ey)	pelite (pelitic)	lutite (lutaceous)
