= Gairich =

Mountain in Highland, Scotland

Coordinates: 57.044879°N 5.255827°W

- Sgùrr Ghairich
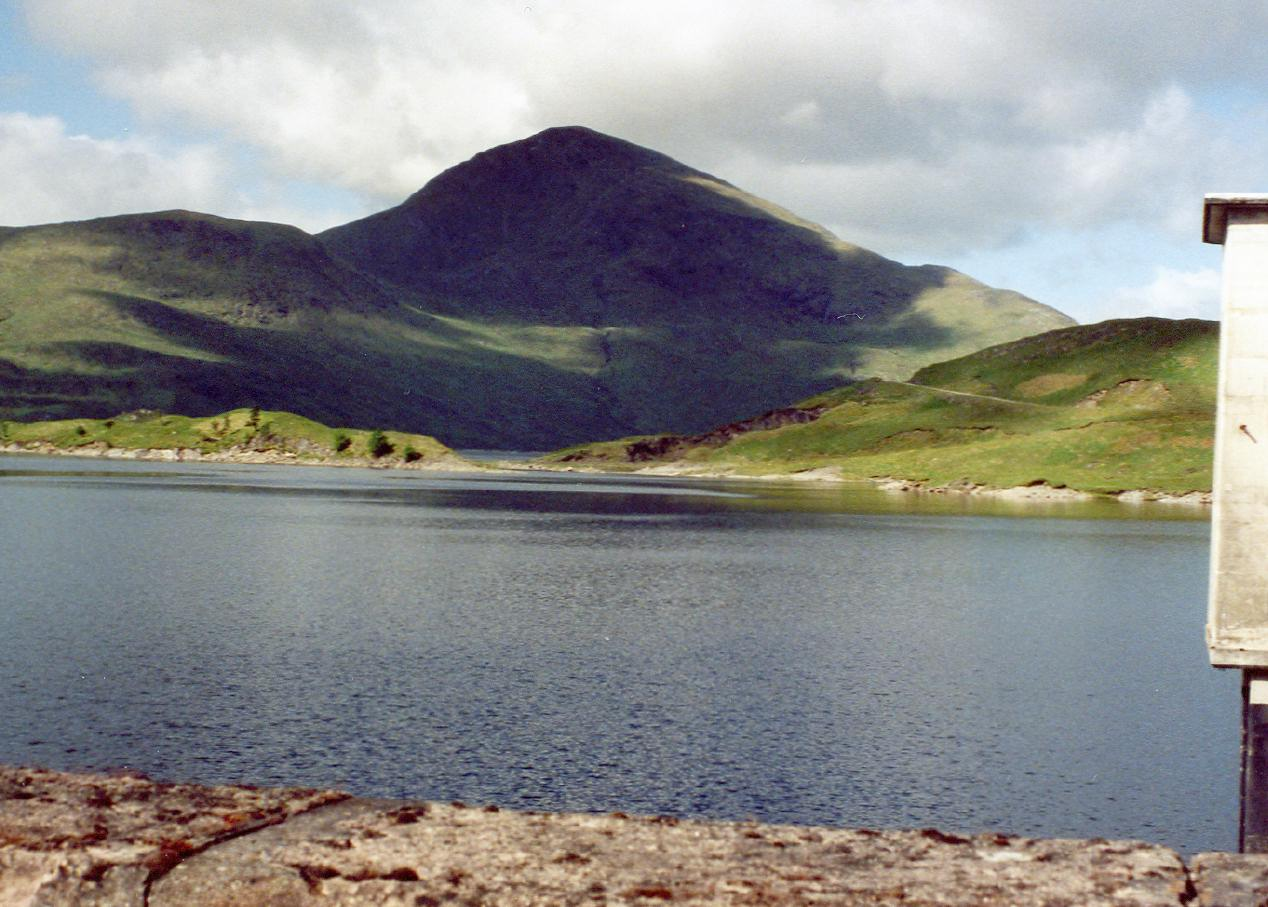
- Gairich seen from the Loch Quoich dam.

Highest point
- Elevation: 919 m (3,015 ft)
- Prominence: 552 m (1,811 ft)
- Parent peak: Sgurr na Ciche
- Listing: Munro, Marilyn

Naming
- Language of name: Gaelic
- Pronunciation: Scottish Gaelic: [ˈkaɾʲɪç] English approximation: GARR-yish

Geography
- Location: Lochaber, Highland, Scotland
- Parent range: Northwest Highlands
- OS grid: NN025995
- Topo map: OS Landranger 33, OS Explorer 414

Climbing
- Easiest route: East Ridge from Quoich dam

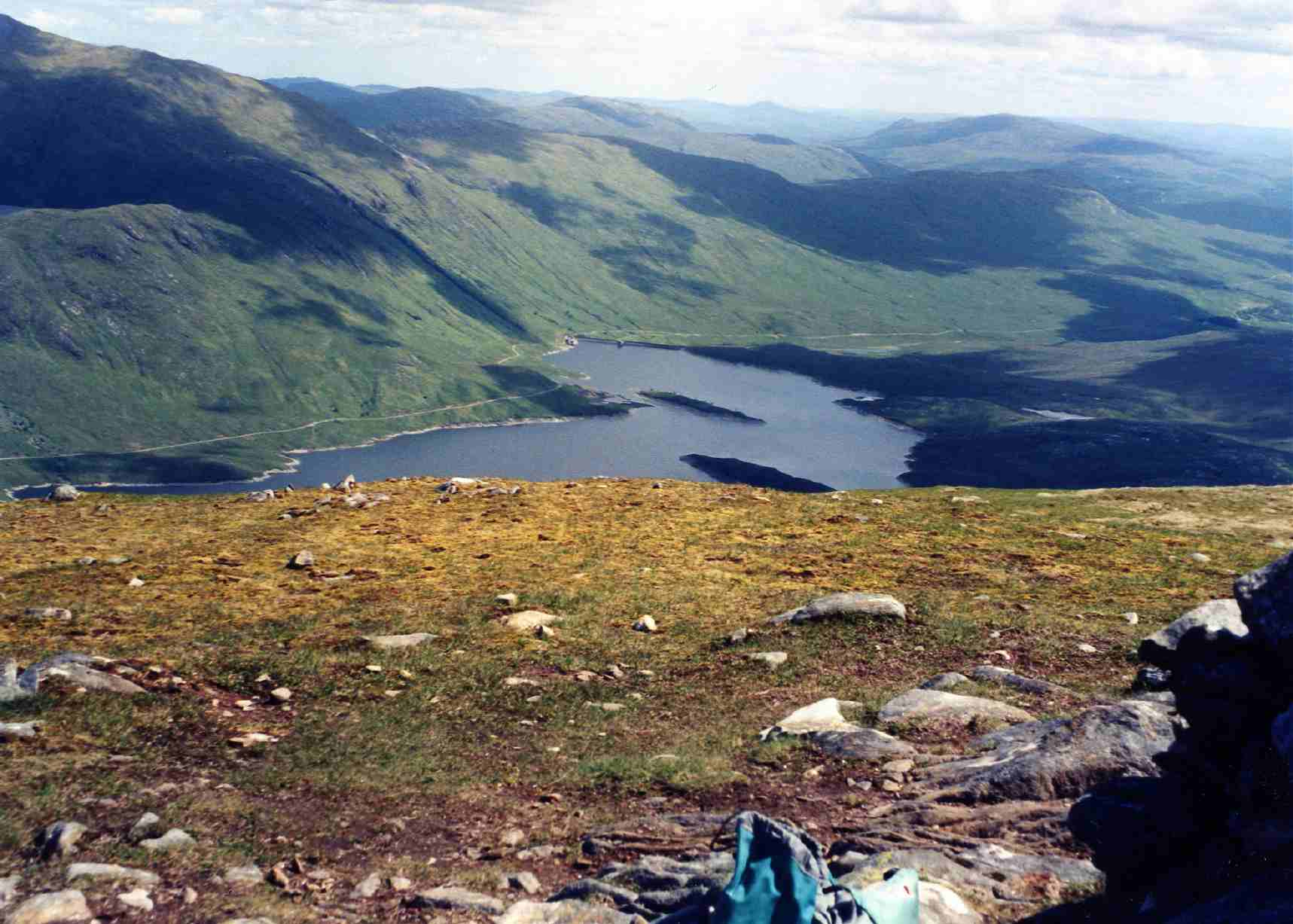
Loch Quoich from Gairich summit.

Gairich, sometimes Sgurr Gairoch (Scottish Gaelic: Sgùrr Ghairich), is a mountain in Lochaber in the Northwest Highlands of Scotland. It is on the southern side of Loch Quoich, with Glen Garry to the east and Glen Kingie to the south, 25 kilometres north-northwest of Fort William.

== Overview ==
With a height of 919 metres (3015 feet), Gairich qualifies as a Munro by just four metres. Despite its relatively low height the mountain is rough and quite isolated with a substantial prominence of 552 metres and is conspicuous in the view up Glen Garry. It is seen as a conical peak when viewed from the Loch Quoich dam (see picture). The mountain was initially named Scour Gairoch on the original 1891 list of Munros and is still occasionally called this, however it is now referred to generally as Gairich. Some sources translate the Gaelic name (Sgùrr) Gairich as "roaring" peak or "peak of yelling". Ainmean-Àite na h-Alba translates it as "Garry's peak".

== Geography ==
Gairich has two notable corries on its slopes. Coire Liath lies on the northern flank of the mountain. It is a kilometre across and is rimmed by crags. It is drained by the Allt a' Choire Leith which flows northwards into Loch Quoich. These lower northern slopes of the mountain formerly had a right of way which went along the southern shore of Loch Quoich, this track was submerged and lost when the loch was dammed in 1957 and the water level was raised by 100 feet as part of the hydro-electric scheme in the Highlands. Lochan Doire Meall an Eilein, a small lake approximately 500 metres in length stands on the northern flanks of Gairich around the 400 metre contour. The eastern slopes of the mountain has the smaller Coire Thollaidh which also drains north into the loch. Gairich is made up of three distinct ridges, the NE and NW ridges form the flanks of Coire Liath and descend to Loch Quoich. Either of these ridges could be used for ascent by walkers approaching the mountain by canoe across the loch. The eastern ridge descends for four kilometres from the summit ending near the Quoich dam and is used in ascending the mountain from that direction.

Although the mountain is seen as a conical peak when viewed from the Quoich dam this is quite misleading as the actual summit plateau extends westward for almost two kilometres culminating in the subsidiary top of Gairich Beag with a height of 730 metres before descending into the a' Mhaingir glen. Gairich is in fact the first peak in a chain of hills which extends westwards over the adjoining Munro of Sgurr Mòr to terminate at Sgurr na Cìche in the remote wilderness of Knoydart. The southern flank of the mountain descends steeply into the lonely Glen Kingie, this precipitous slope has a large impressive gully on it which is drained by the Allt am Fhamhair. Glen Kingie itself can be a difficult barrier when approaching Gairich from the south with the River Kingie being an impossible obstacle when it is in spate and needing wading at other times because of the absence of bridges. The Kinbreack bothy in Glen Kingie is a useful base for climbing the mountains in this area.

== Ascents ==
The usual ascent of Gairich starts at the car park at the Loch Quoich dam at grid reference NH070024. From there the dam wall is crossed and a path is picked up which goes south for 2.5 kilometres to reach the lower part of the east ridge. It is then a five kilometre climb up the ridge to the highest point, crossing the subsidiary top of Bac nam Foid (584 metres) on the way. The final section to the summit is a steep climb with one tricky narrow bit. It is also possible to climb the mountain from the south, starting at the road end by Loch Arkaig at Strathan at grid reference NM986915 and following an old right of way to Tomdoun in Glen Garry as far as the Kinbreack bothy in Glen Kingie. The best place to wade the Kingie is near the bothy, Gairich can then be ascended by its western flank passing over Gairich Beag to reach the summit.
