= Mudrock =

Type of sedimentary rock

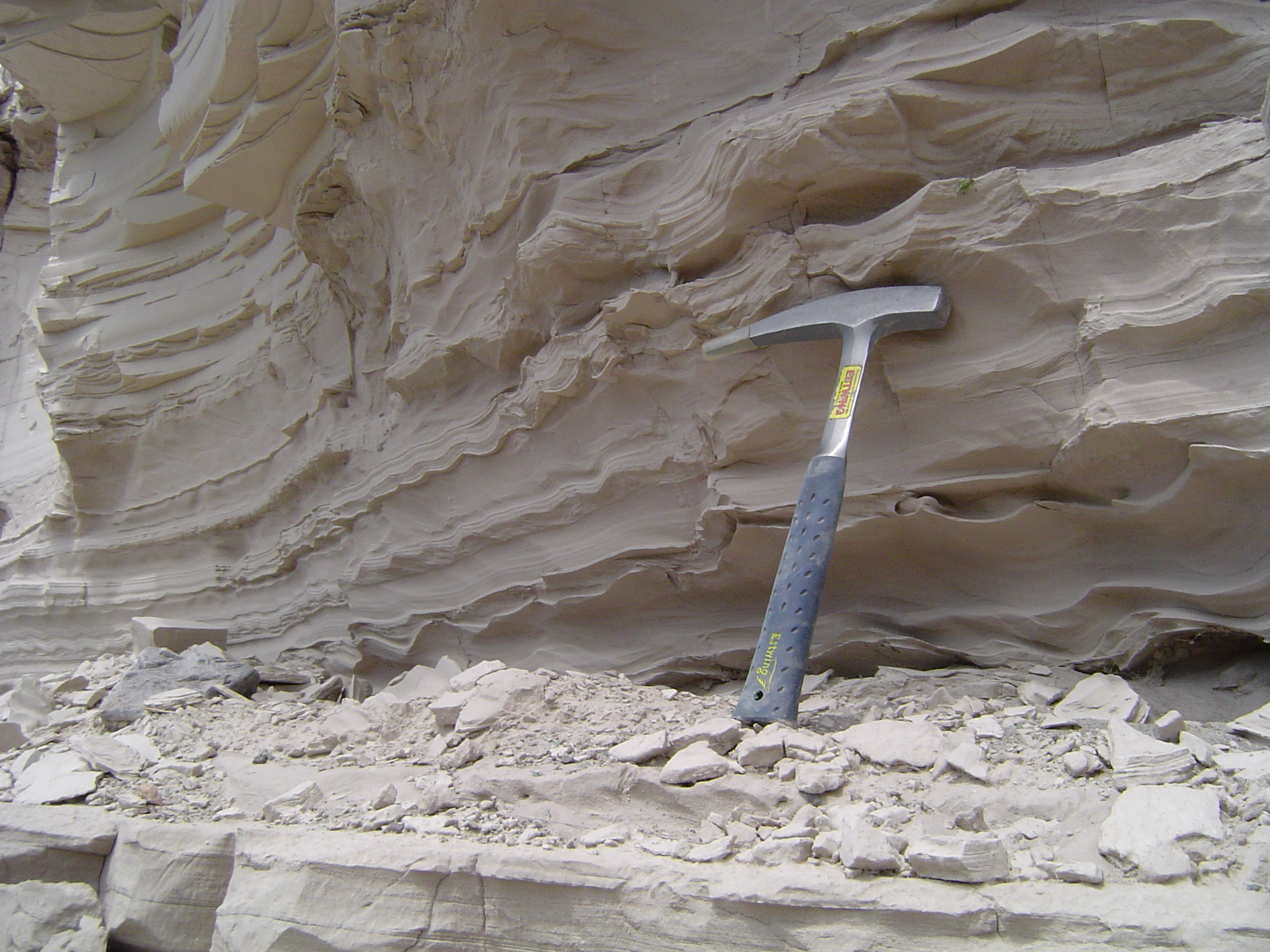
Glacial Lake Missoula claystone

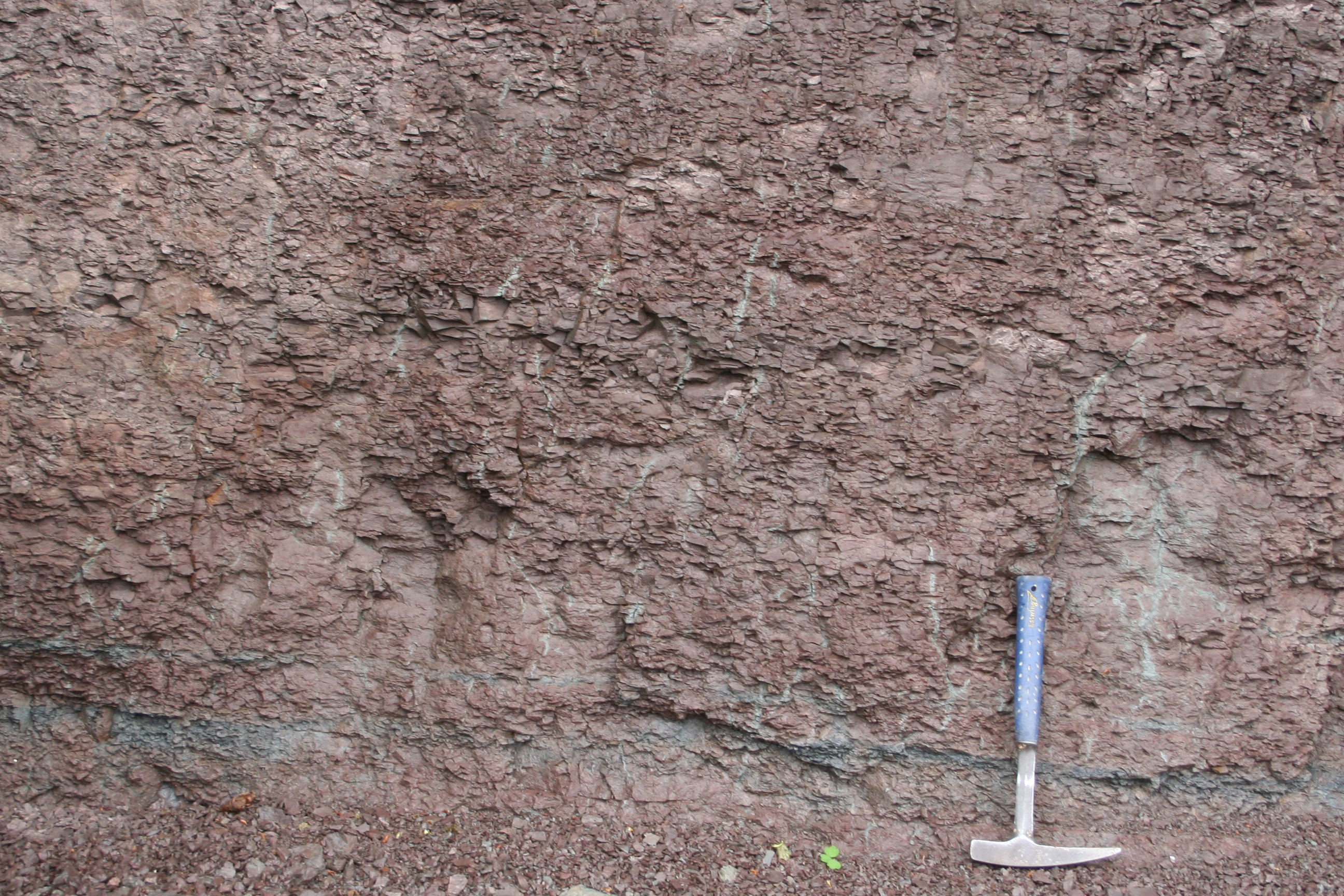
Red mudrock in the Ragged Reef Formation (Pennsylvanian), Cumberland Basin, Nova Scotia

Mudrocks are a class of fine-grained siliciclastic sedimentary rocks. The varying types of mudrocks include siltstone, claystone, mudstone and shale. Most of the particles of which the stone is composed are less than 1/16 mm (0.0625 mm; 0.00246 in) and are too small to study readily in the field. At first sight, the rock types appear quite similar; however, there are important differences in composition and nome

nclature.

There has been a great deal of disagreement involving the classification of mudrocks. A few important hurdles to their classification include the following:

1. Mudrocks are the least understood and among the most understudied sedimentary rocks to date.
2. Studying mudrock constituents is difficult due to their diminutive size and susceptibility to weathering on outcrops.
3. And most importantly, scientists accept more than one classification scheme.

Mudrocks make up 50% of the sedimentary rocks in the geologic record and are easily the most widespread deposits on Earth. Fine sediment is the most abundant product of erosion, and these sediments contribute to the overall omnipresence of mudrocks. With increased pressure over time, the platey clay minerals may become aligned, with the appearance of parallel layering (fissility). This finely bedded material that splits readily into thin layers is called shale, as distinct from mudstone. The lack of fissility or layering in mudstone may be due either to the original texture, such as the presence of non-platy grains which disrupt the fabric during consolidation, or to the disruption of layering by burrowing organisms in the sediment prior to lithification.

From the beginning of civilization, when pottery and mudbricks were made by hand, to now, mudrocks have been important. The first book on mudrocks, Geologie des Argils by Millot, was not published until 1964; however, scientists, engineers, and oil producers have understood the significance of mudrocks since the discovery of the Burgess Shale and the relatedness of mudrocks and oil. Literature on this omnipresent rock-type has been increasing in recent years, and technology continues to allow for better analysis.

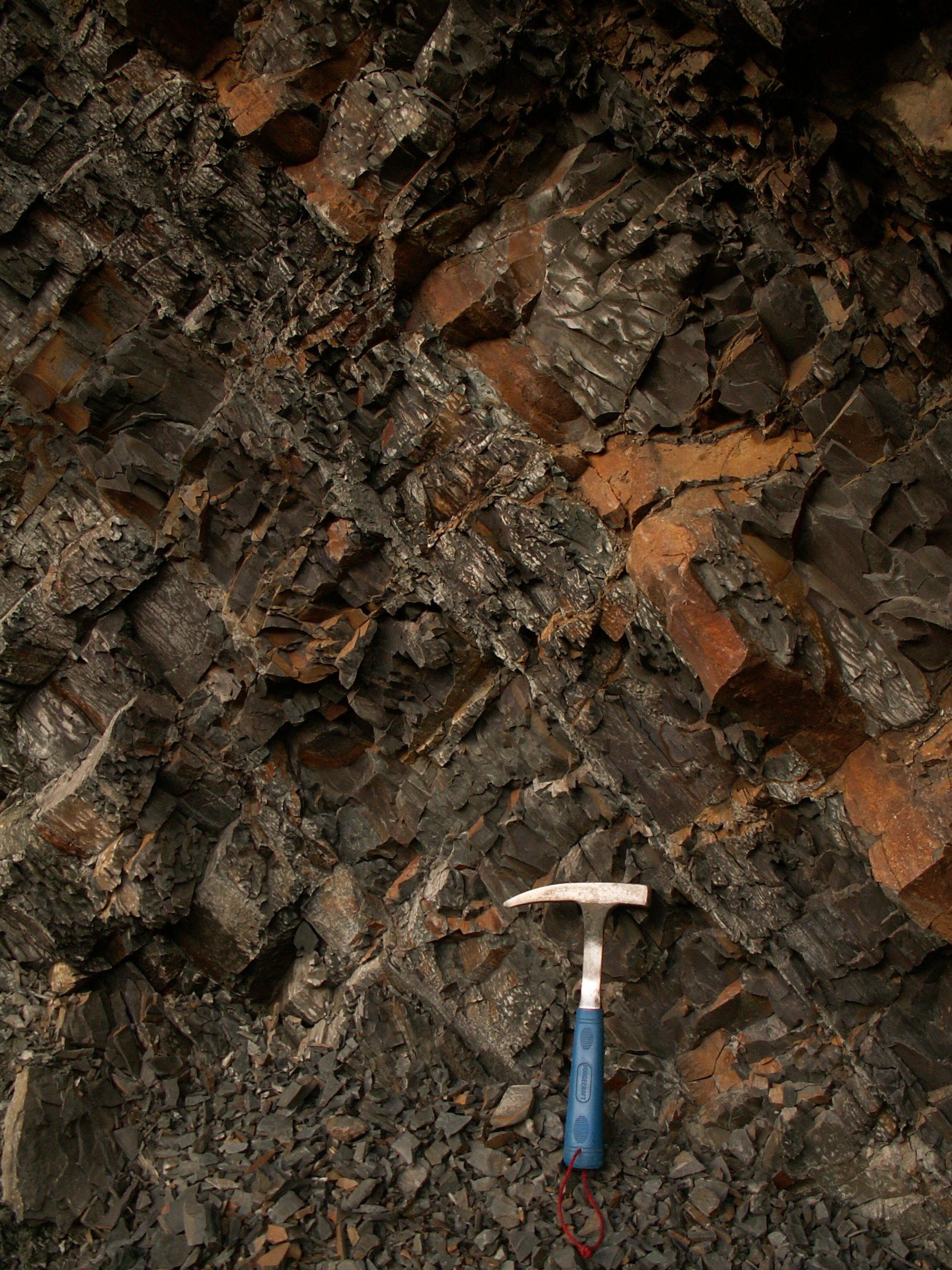
Claystone in Slovakia

== Nomenclature ==
Mudrocks, by definition, consist of at least fifty percent mud-sized particles. Specifically, mud is composed of silt-sized particles that are between 1/16 – 1/256 ((1/16)^{2}) of a millimeter in diameter, and clay-sized particles which are less than 1/256 millimeter.

Mudrocks contain mostly clay minerals, and quartz and feldspars. They can also contain the following particles at less than 63 micrometres: calcite, dolomite, siderite, pyrite, marcasite, heavy minerals, and even organic carbon.

There are various synonyms for fine-grained siliciclastic rocks containing fifty percent or more of its constituents less than 1/256 of a millimeter. Mudstones, shales, lutites, and argillites are common qualifiers, or umbrella terms; however, the term mudrock has increasingly become the terminology of choice by sedimentary geologists and authors.

The term "mudrock" allows for further subdivisions of siltstone, claystone, mudstone, argilite and shale. For example, a siltstone would be made of more than 50-percent grains that equate to 1/16 - 1/256 of a millimeter. "Shale" denotes fissility, which implies an ability to part easily or break parallel to stratification. Siltstone, mudstone, and claystone implies lithified, or hardened, detritus without fissility.

Overall, "mudrocks" may be the most useful qualifying term, because it allows for rocks to be divided by its greatest portion of contributing grains and their respective grain size, whether silt, clay, or mud.

Type	Min grain	Max grain
Claystone	0 μm	4 μm
Mudstone	0 μm	64 μm
Siltstone	4 μm	64 μm
Shale	0 μm	64 μm
Slate	na	na

=== Claystone ===
A claystone is a lithified and non-cleavable mudrock. In order for a rock to be considered a claystone, it must consist of at least fifty percent clay (phyllosilicates), whose particle measures less than 1/256 of a millimeter in size. Clay minerals are integral to mudrocks, and represent the first or second most abundant constituent by volume. They make muds cohesive and plastic, or able to flow. Clay minerals are usually very finely grained and represent the smallest particles recognized in mudrocks. However, quartz, feldspar, iron oxides, and carbonates can also weather to the sizes of typical clay mineral grains.

For a size comparison, a clay-sized particle is 1/1000 the size of a sand grain. This means a clay particle will travel 1000 times further at constant water velocity, thus requiring quieter conditions for settlement.

The formation of clay is well understood, and can come from soil, volcanic ash, and glaciation. Ancient mudrocks are another source, because they weather and disintegrate easily. Feldspar, amphiboles, pyroxenes, and volcanic glass are the principle donors of clay minerals.

=== Mudstone ===
A mudstone is a siliciclastic sedimentary rock that contains a mixture of silt- and clay-sized particles (at least 1/3 of each).

The terminology of "mudstone" is not to be confused with the Dunham classification scheme for limestones. In Dunham's classification, a mudstone is any limestone containing less than ten percent carbonate grains. Note, a siliciclastic mudstone does not deal with carbonate grains. Friedman, Sanders, and Kopaska-Merkel (1992) suggest the use of "lime mudstone" to avoid confusion with siliciclastic rocks.

=== Siltstone ===
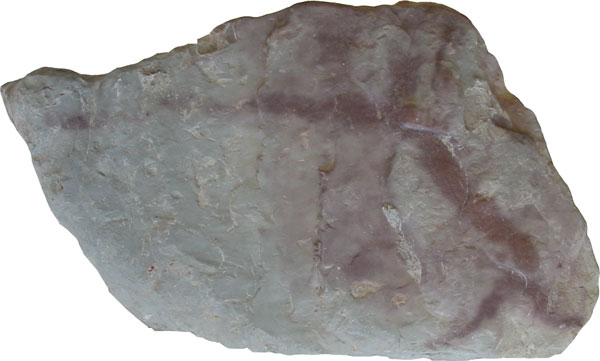
Siltstone at UAT, Estonia

A siltstone is a lithified, non-cleavable mudrock. In order for a rock to be named a siltstone, it must contain over fifty percent silt-sized material. Silt is any particle smaller than sand, 1/16 of a millimeter, and larger than clay, 1/256 of millimeter. Silt is believed to be the product of physical weathering, which can involve freezing and thawing, thermal expansion, and release of pressure. Physical weathering does not involve any chemical changes in the rock, and it may be best summarised as the physical breaking apart of a rock.

One of the highest proportions of silt found on Earth is in the Himalayas, where phyllites are exposed to rainfall of up to five to ten meters (16 to 33 feet) a year. Quartz and feldspar are the biggest contributors to the silt realm, and silt tends to be non-cohesive, non-plastic, but can liquefy easily.

There is a simple test that can be done in the field to determine whether a rock is a siltstone or not, and that is to put the rock to one's teeth. If the rock feels "gritty" against one's teeth, then it is a siltstone.

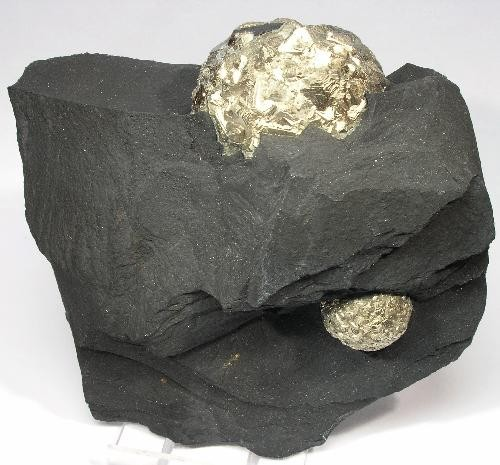
Black Shale with pyrite

=== Shale ===
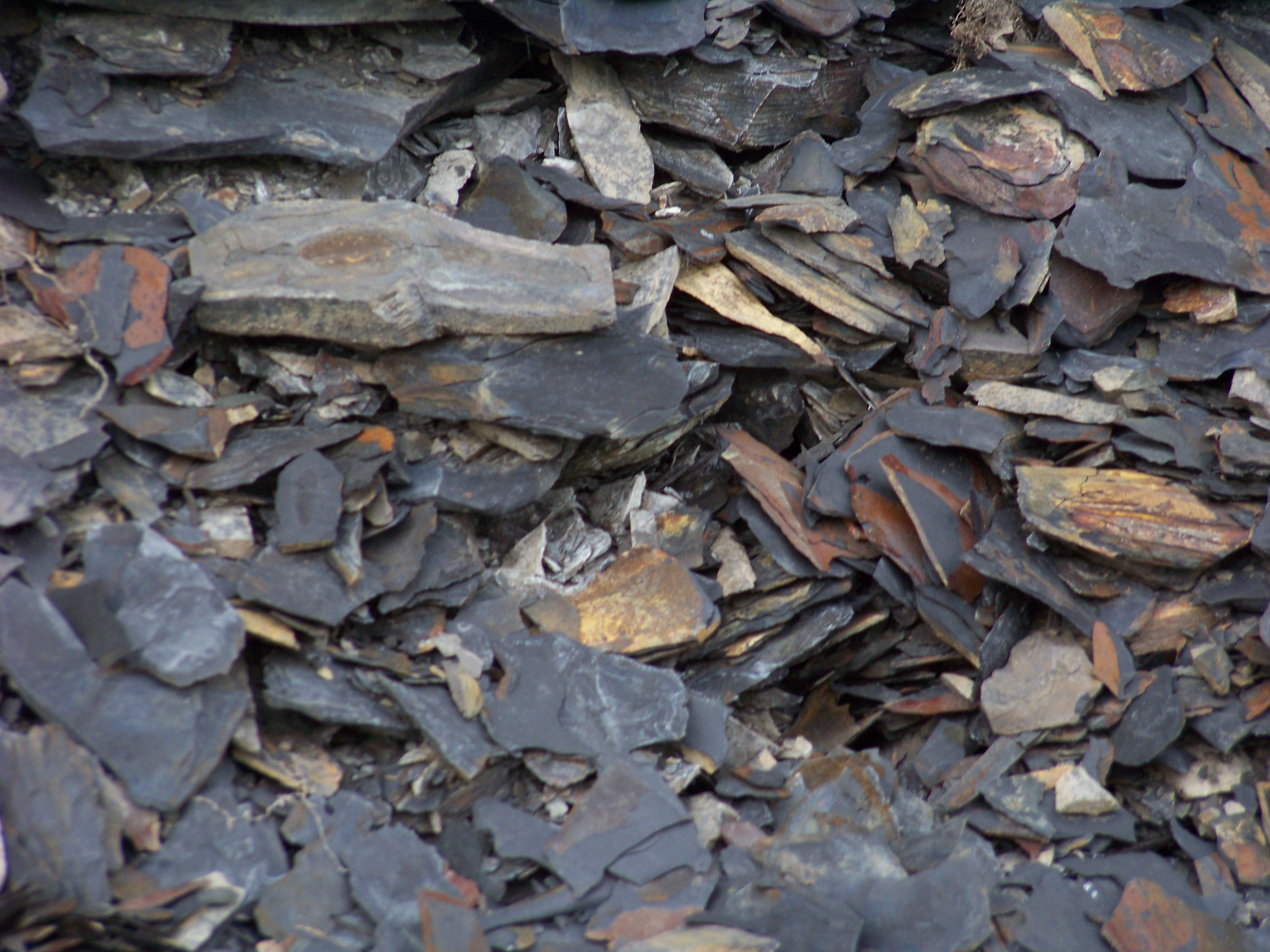
Marcellus Shale, New York

Shale is a fine grained, hard, laminated mudrock, consisting of clay minerals, and quartz and feldspar silt. Shale is lithified and cleavable. It must have at least 50-percent of its particles measure less than 0.062 mm. This term is confined to argillaceous, or clay-bearing, rock.

There are many varieties of shale, including calcareous and organic-rich; however, black shale, or organic-rich shale, deserves further evaluation. In order for a shale to be a black shale, it must contain more than one percent organic carbon. A good source rock for hydrocarbons can contain up to twenty percent organic carbon. Generally, black shale receives its influx of carbon from algae, which decays and forms an ooze known as sapropel. When this ooze is cooked at desired pressure, three to six kilometers (1.8 - 3.7 miles) depth, and temperature, 90–120 °C (194–248 °F), it will form kerogen. Kerogen can be heated, and yield up to 10–150 US gallons (0.038–0.568 m^{3}) of natural oil and gas product per ton of rock.

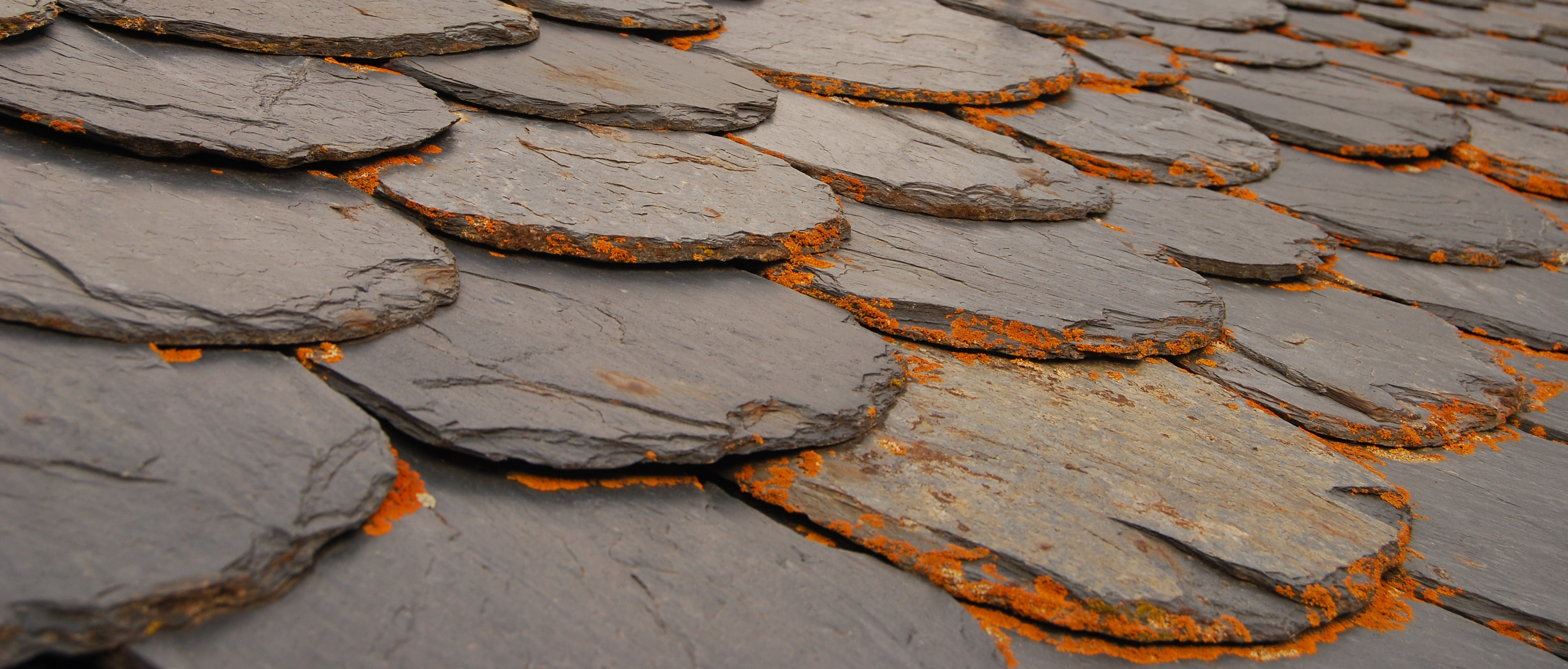
Slate Roof

=== Slate ===
Slate is a hard mudstone that has undergone metamorphism, and has well-developed cleavage. It has gone through metamorphism at temperatures between 200–250 °C (392–482 °F), or extreme deformation. Since slate is formed in the lower realm of metamorphism, based on pressure and temperature, slate retains its stratification and can be defined as a hard, fine-grained rock.

Slate is often used for roofing, flooring, or old-fashioned stone walls. It has an attractive appearance, and its ideal cleavage and smooth texture are desirable.

== Creation of mud and mudrocks ==
Most mudrocks form in oceans or lakes, because these environments provide the quiet waters necessary for deposition. Although mudrocks can be found in every depositional environment on Earth, the majority are found in lakes and oceans.

=== Mud transport and supply ===
Heavy rainfall provides the kinetic motion necessary for mud, clay, and silt transport. Southeast Asia, including Bangladesh and India, receives high amounts of rain from monsoons, which then washes sediment from the Himalayas and surrounding areas to the Indian Ocean.

Warm, wet climates are best for weathering rocks, and there is more mud on ocean shelves off tropical coasts than on temperate or polar shelves. The Amazon system, for example, has the third largest sediment load on Earth, with rainfall providing clay, silt, and mud from the Andes in Peru, Ecuador, and Bolivia.

Rivers, waves, and longshore currents segregate mud, silt, and clay from sand and gravel due to fall velocity. Longer rivers, with low gradients and large watersheds, have the best carrying capacity for mud. The Mississippi River, a good example of long, low gradient river with a large amount of water, will carry mud from its northernmost sections, and deposit the material in its mud-dominated delta.

=== Mudrock depositional environments ===
Below is a listing of various environments that act as sources, modes of transportation to the oceans, and environments of deposition for mudrocks.

==== Alluvial environments ====
The Ganges in India, the Yellow in China, and the Lower Mississippi in the United States are good examples of alluvial valleys. These systems have a continuous source of water, and can contribute mud through overbank sedimentation, when mud and silt is deposited overbank during flooding, and oxbow sedimentation where an abandoned stream is filled by mud.

In order for an alluvial valley to exist there must be a highly elevated zone, usually uplifted by active tectonic movement, and a lower zone, which acts as a conduit for water and sediment to the ocean.

==== Glaciers ====
Vast quantities of mud and till are generated by glaciations and deposited on land as till and in lakes. Glaciers can erode already susceptible mudrock formations, and this process enhances glacial production of clay and silt.

The Northern Hemisphere contains 90-percent of the world's lakes larger than 500 km (310 mi), and glaciers created many of those lakes. Lake deposits formed by glaciation, including deep glacial scouring, are abundant.

==== Non-glacial lakes ====
Although glaciers formed 90-percent of lakes in the Northern Hemisphere, they are not responsible for the formation of ancient lakes. Ancient lakes are the largest and deepest in the world, and hold up to twenty percent of today's petroleum reservoirs. They are also the second most abundant source of mudrocks, behind marine mudrocks.

Ancient lakes owe their abundance of mudrocks to their long lives and thick deposits. These deposits were susceptible to changes in oxygen and rainfall, and offer a robust account of paleoclimate consistency.

==== Deltas ====
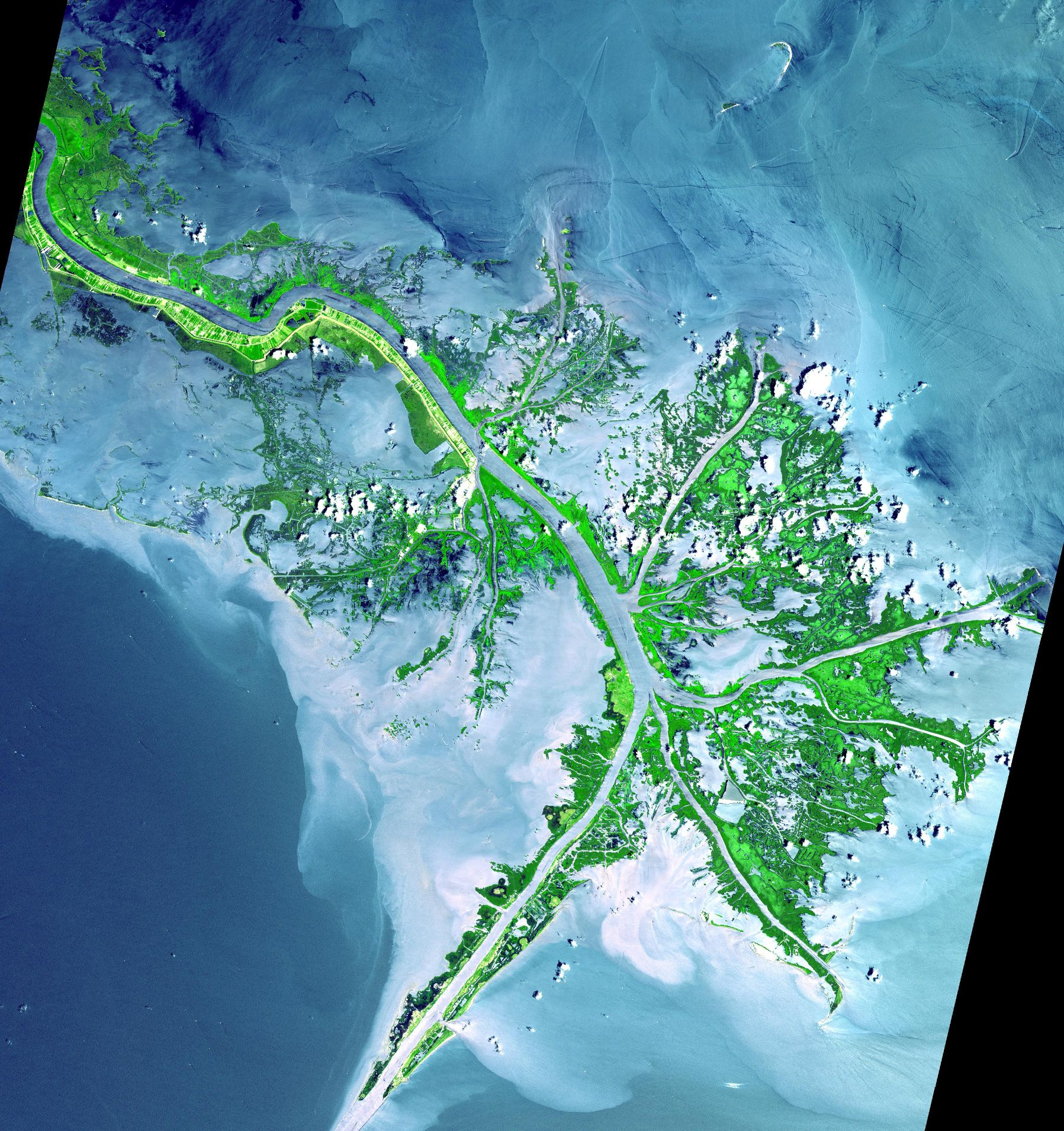
The Mississippi Delta

A delta is a subaerial or subaqueous deposit formed where rivers or streams deposit sediment into a water body. Deltas, such as the Mississippi and Congo, have massive potential for sediment deposit, and can move sediments into deep ocean waters. Delta environments are found at the mouth of a river, where its waters slow as they enter the ocean, and silt and clay are deposited.

Low energy deltas, which deposit a great deal of mud, are located in lakes, gulfs, seas, and small oceans, where coastal currents are also low. Sand and gravel-rich deltas are high-energy deltas, where waves dominate, and mud and silt are carried much farther from the mouth of the river.

==== Coastlines ====
Coastal currents, mud supply, and waves are a key factor in coastline mud deposition. The Amazon River supplies 500 million tons of sediment, which is mostly clay, to the coastal region of northeastern South America. 250 tons of this sediment moves along the coast and is deposited. Much of the mud accumulated here is more than 20 meters (65 feet) thick, and extends 30 kilometers (19 mi) into the ocean.

Much of the sediment carried by the Amazon can come from the Andes mountains, and the final distance traveled by the sediment is 6,000 km (3,700 mi).

==== Marine environments ====
70-percent of the Earth's surface is covered by ocean, and marine environments are where we find the world's highest proportion of mudrocks. There is a great deal of lateral continuity found in the ocean, as opposed to continents which are confined.

In comparison, continents are temporary stewards of mud and silt, and the inevitable home of mudrock sediments is the oceans. Reference the mudrock cycle below in order to understand the burial and resurgence of the various particles.

There are various environments in the oceans, including deep-sea trenches, abyssal plains, volcanic seamounts, convergent, divergent, and transform plate margins. Not only is land a major source of the ocean sediments, but organisms living within the ocean contribute, as well.

The world's rivers transport the largest volume of suspended and dissolved loads of clay and silt to the sea, where they are deposited on ocean shelves. At the poles, glaciers and floating ice drop deposits directly to the sea floor. Winds can provide fine grained material from arid regions, and explosive volcanic eruptions contribute as well. All of these sources vary in the rate of their contribution.

Sediment moves to the deeper parts of the oceans by gravity, and the processes in the ocean are comparable to those on land.

Location has a large impact on the types of mudrocks found in ocean environments. For example, the Apalachicola River, which drains in the subtropics of the United States, carries up to sixty to eighty percent kaolinite mud, whereas the Mississippi carries only ten to twenty percent kaolinite.

=== The mudrock cycle ===
We can imagine the beginning of a mudrock's life as sediment at the top of a mountain, which may have been uplifted by plate tectonics or propelled into the air from a volcano. This sediment is exposed to rain, wind, and gravity which batters and breaks apart the rock by weathering. The products of weathering, including particles ranging from clay to silt, to pebbles and boulders, are transported to the basin below, where it can solidify into one if its many sedimentary mudstone types.

Eventually, the mudrock will move its way kilometers below the subsurface, where pressure and temperature cook the mudstone into a metamorphosed gneiss. The metamorphosed gneiss will make its way to the surface once again as country rock or as magma in a volcano, and the whole process will begin again.

== Important properties ==
=== Color ===
Mudrocks form in various colors, including: red, purple, brown, yellow, green and grey, and even black. Shades of grey are most common in mudrocks, and darker colors of black come from organic carbons. Green mudrocks form in reducing conditions, where organic matter decomposes along with ferric iron. They can also be found in marine environments, where pelagic, or free-floating species, settle out of the water and decompose in the mudrock. Red mudrocks form when iron within the mudrock becomes oxidized, and depending on the intensity of red, one can determine if the rock has fully oxidized.

=== Fossils ===
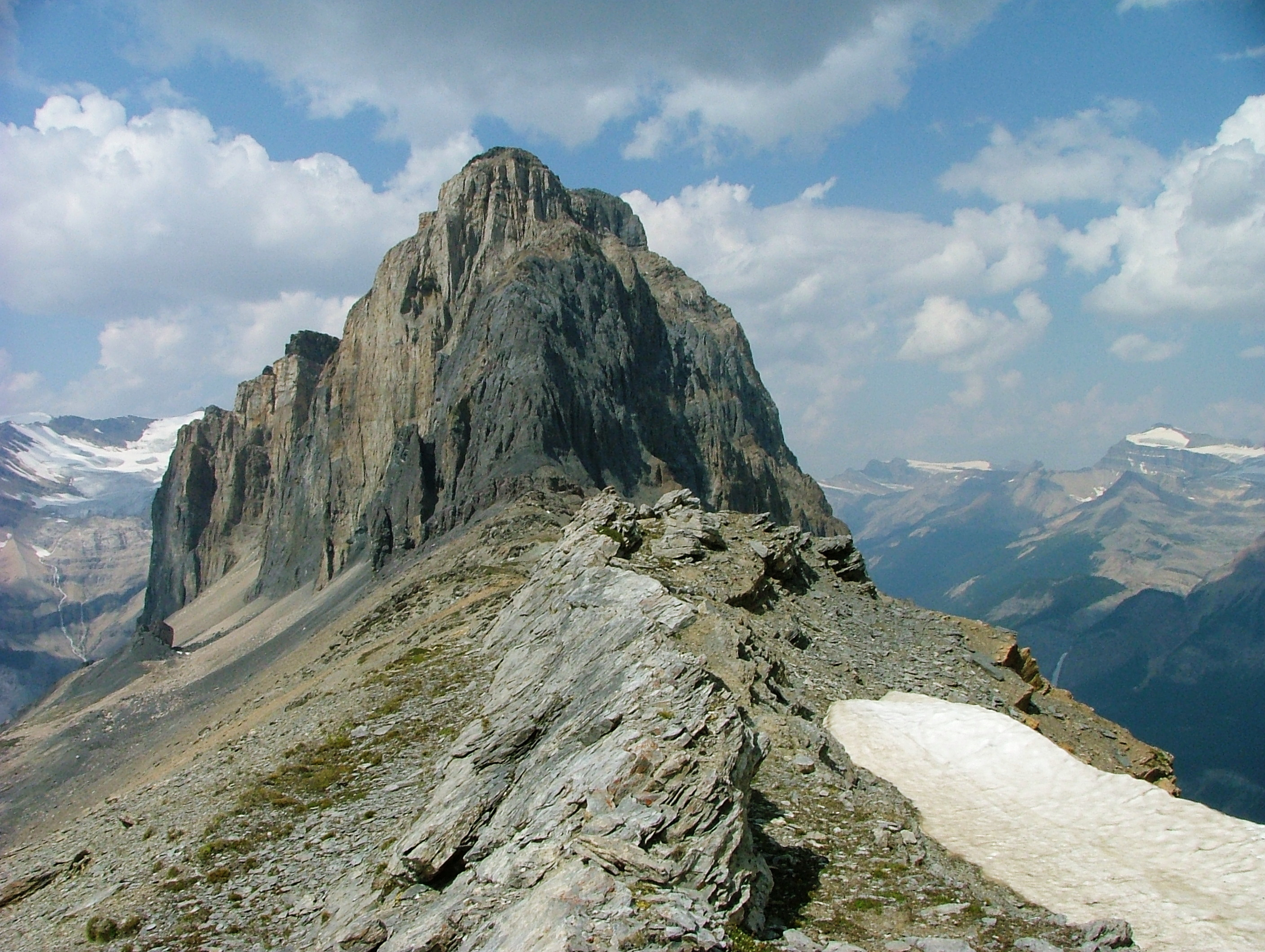
Burgess Shale

Fossils are well preserved in mudrock formations, because the fine-grained rock protects the fossils from erosion, dissolution, and other processes of erosion. Fossils are particularly important for recording past environments. Paleontologists can look at a specific area and determine salinity, water depth, water temperature, water turbidity, and sedimentation rates with the aid of type and abundance of fossils in mudrock

One of the most famous mudrock formations is the Burgess Shale in Western Canada, which formed during the Cambrian. At this site, soft bodied creatures were preserved, some in whole, by the activity of mud in a sea. Solid skeletons are, generally, the only remnants of ancient life preserved; however, the Burgess Shale includes hard body parts such as bones, skeletons, teeth, and also soft body parts such as muscles, gills, and digestive systems. The Burgess Shale is one of the most significant fossil locations on Earth, preserving innumerable specimens of 500 million year old species, and its preservation is due to the protection of mudrock.

Another noteworthy formation is the Morrison Formation. This area covers 1.5 million square miles, stretching from Montana to New Mexico in the United States. It is considered one of the world's most significant dinosaur burial grounds, and its many fossils can be found in museums around the world. This site includes dinosaur fossils from a few dinosaur species, including the Allosaurus, Diplodocus, Stegosaurus, and Brontosaurus. There are also lungfish, freshwater mollusks, ferns and conifers. This deposit was formed by a humid, tropical climate with lakes, swamps, and rivers, which deposited mudrock. Inevitably, mudrock preserved countless specimens from the late Jurassic, roughly 150 million years ago.

=== Petroleum and natural gas ===
Mudrocks, especially black shale, are the source and containers of precious petroleum sources throughout the world. Since mudrocks and organic material require quiet water conditions for deposition, mudrocks are the most likely resource for petroleum. Mudrocks have low porosity, they are impermeable, and often, if the mudrock is not black shale, it remains useful as a seal to petroleum and natural gas reservoirs. In the case of petroleum found in a reservoir, the rock surrounding the petroleum is not the source rock, whereas black shale is a source rock.

== Importance ==
As noted before, mudrocks make up fifty percent of the Earth's sedimentary geological record. They are widespread on Earth, and important for various industries.

Metamorphosed shale can hold emerald and gold, and mudrocks can host ore metals such as lead and zinc. Mudrocks are important in the preservation of petroleum and natural gas, due to their low porosity, and are commonly used by engineers to inhibit harmful fluid leakage from landfills.

Sandstones and carbonates record high-energy events in our history. Interbedded between the high-energy events are mudrock formations that have recorded quieter, normal conditions in our Earth's history. More common lower energy impacts leave less effects upon the surface, and as such are more difficult to study. As a result of this, there is less available knowledge about these events. Sandstones provide the a tectonic picture and some indications of water depth; mudrocks record oxygen content, a richer fossil abundance and diversity, and informative geochemistry.

In recognition of mud and mudrocks' sometimes unappreciated importance to earth sciences, the Geological Society of London named 2015 as the "Year of Mud".
