= Fraoch Bheinn =

Mountain in Scotland

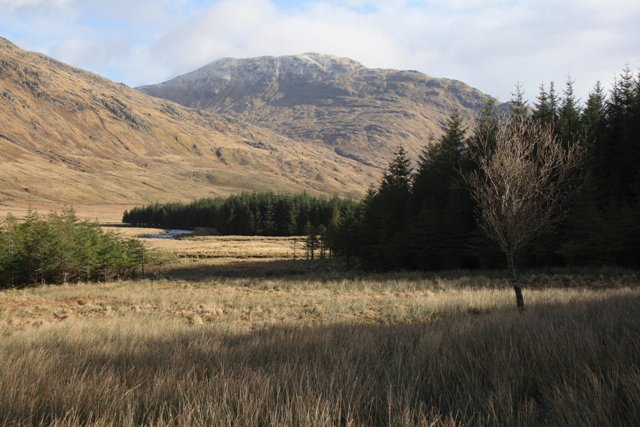
- Fraoch Bheinn

Highest point
- Elevation: 858 m (2,815 ft)
- Prominence: 400 m (1,300 ft)
- Listing: Corbett, Marilyn
- Coordinates: 56°59′36″N 5°19′01″W

Geography
- Location: Lochaber, Scotland
- Parent range: Northwest Highlands
- OS grid: NM986940
- Topo map: OS Landranger 33, 40

Fraoch Bheinn (858 m) is a remote mountain in the Northwest Highlands, Scotland, located at the head of Loch Arkaig in Lochaber.

Glen Dessary lies to the south and the Glen Kingie on its northern side.
