= Arenite =

Sedimentary clastic rock

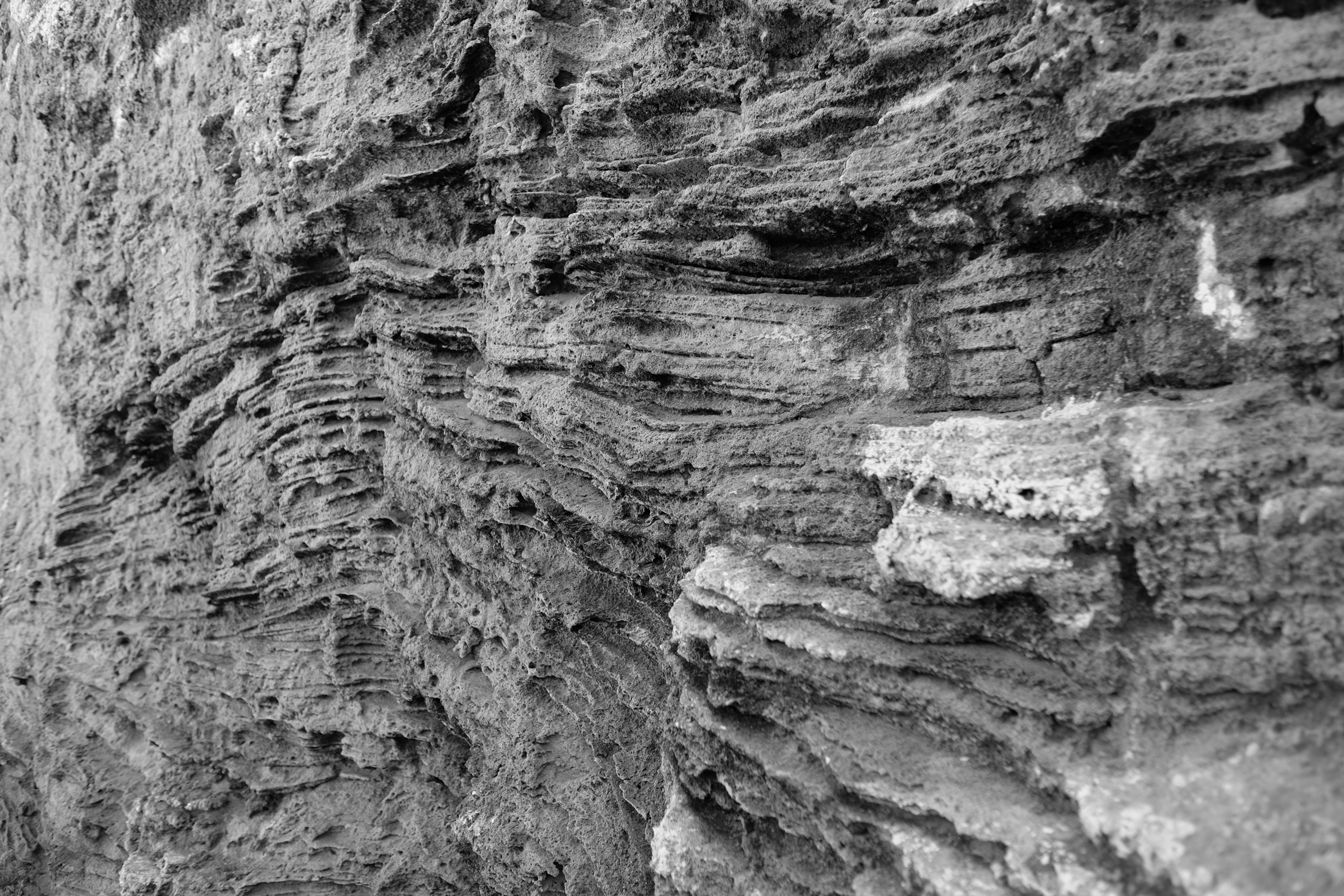
Arenite

Arenite (from Latin arena 'sand') is a sedimentary clastic rock with sand grain size between 0.0625 and 2.0 mm (0.0025 and 0.0787 in) and containing less than 15% matrix. The related adjective is arenaceous. The equivalent Greek-derived term is psammite, though this is more commonly used for metamorphosed sediments.

Since it refers to grain size rather than chemical composition, the term is used for example in the classification of clastic carbonatic limestones, as the granulometrically equivalent term sandstone is not appropriate for limestone. Other arenites include sandstones, arkoses, greensands, and greywackes.

Arenites mainly form by erosion of other rocks or turbiditic re-deposition of sands. Some arenites contain a varying amount of carbonatic components and thus belong to the rock-category of carbonatic sandstones or silicatic limestones. Arenites often appear as massive or bedded medium-grained rocks with a middling- to wide-spaced preferred lamination and often develop a pronounced cleavage.

Pettijohn gives the following descriptive terms based on grain size, avoiding the use of terms such as "clay" or "argillaceous" which carry an implication of chemical composition:

Descriptive size terms
Texture	Common	Greek	Latin
Coarse	gravel(ly)	psephite (psephitic)	rudite (rudaceous)
Medium	sand(y)	psammite (psammitic)	arenite (arenaceous)
Fine	clay(ey)	pelite (pelitic)	lutite (lutaceous)
