= Sgùrr Mhurlagain =

Scottish mountain west of Spean Bridge

Coordinates: 56.999°N 5.276°W

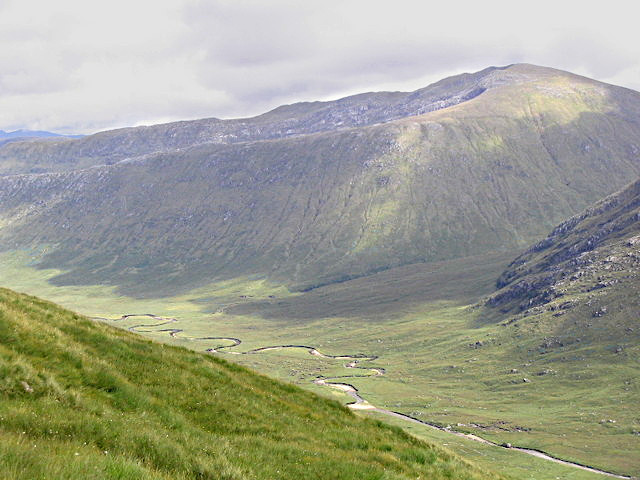
- Sgùrr Mhurlagain with Glen Kingie in the foreground

Highest point
- Elevation: 880 m (2,890 ft)
- Prominence: 515 m (1,690 ft)
- Listing: Corbett, Marilyn

Geography
- Location: Lochaber, Scotland
- Parent range: Northwest Highlands
- OS grid: NN012944
- Topo map: OS Landranger 33

Sgùrr Mhurlagain (880 m) is a mountain in the Northwest Highlands, Scotland, west of the village of Spean Bridge in Lochaber.

A large and bulky peak, it forms much of the southern wall of Glen Kingie, whereas Loch Arkaig lies to its south. Three ridges descend from its summit to the northeast.
