= Loch Bruicheach =

Mountain loch in Scotland

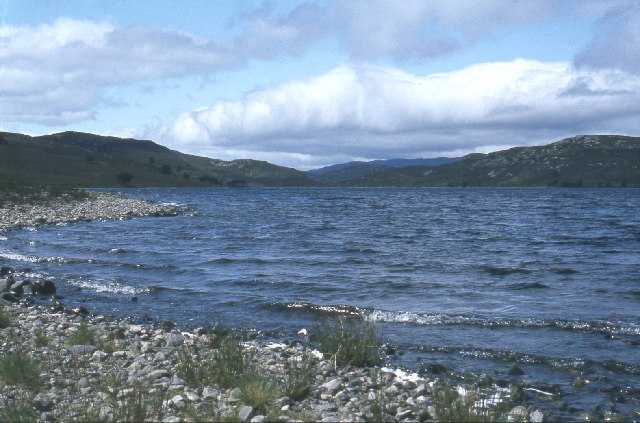
- Loch Bruicheach, from its southeast shore

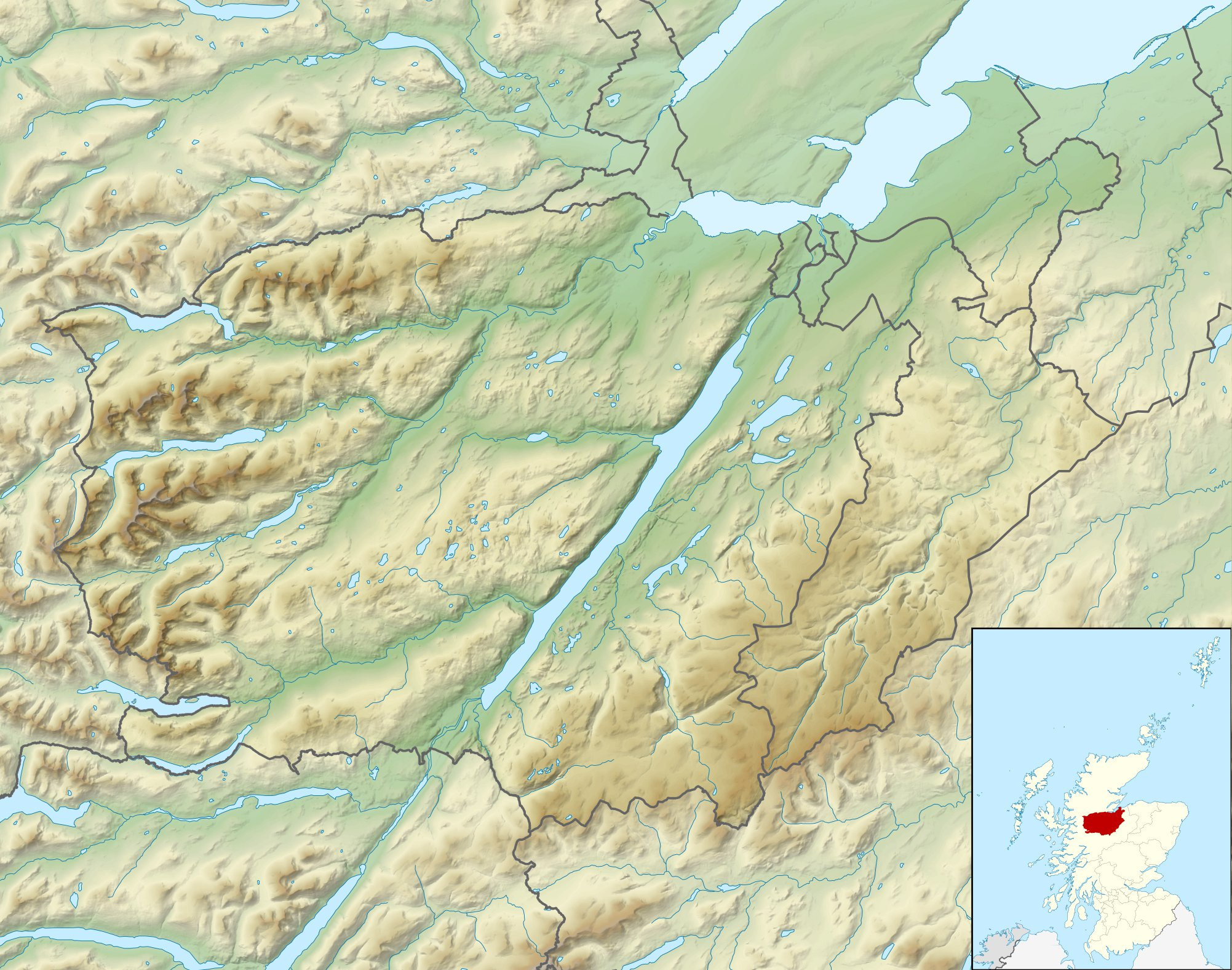
- Location within Inverness area
- Location: Scottish Highlands
- Coordinates: 57°23′N 4°34′W
- Primary outflows: Bruiach Burn
- Basin countries: Scotland, United Kingdom
- Max. length: 1.88 km (1.17 mi)
- Max. width: 809.44 m (2,655.6 ft)
- Surface elevation: 288.2 m (946 ft)

Loch Bruicheach is a remote mountain loch, situated on the edge of Boblainy Forest in the Highland council area of Scotland. The nearest settlement to it is Eskadale, a small hamlet 1.74 miles (2.8 km) to the north, across a wide stretch of moorland.

The name may derive from an Old Gaelic word meaning "boiling" or "raging", and is shared with the loch's primary outflow, the Bruiach Burn.

Archaeological evidence has shown the loch to have once contained a crannog on its north shore.

In the past, Loch Bruicheach has been a popular fishing ground for the common greenshank, a rare bird in the area.
