= Pelite =

Metamorphic rock

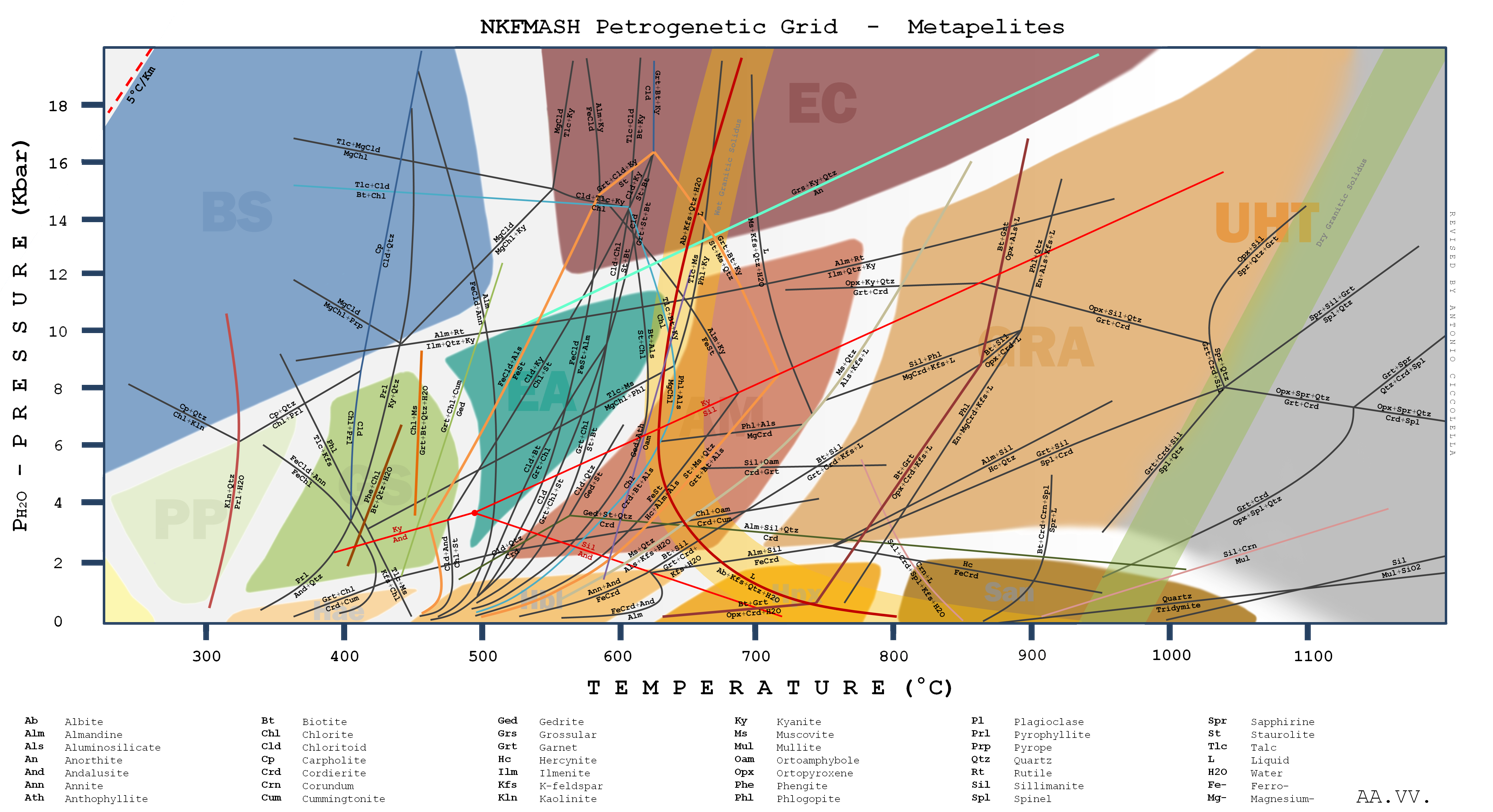
Petrogenetic grid for metapelites (click to zoom). Each line represents a metamorphic reaction. Metamorphic facies included are: BS = Blueschist facies, EC = Eclogite facies, PP = Prehnite-Pumpellyite facies, GS = Greenschist facies, EA = Epidote-Amphibolite facies, AM = Amphibolite facies, GRA = Granulite facies, UHT = Ultra-High Temperature facies, HAE = Hornfels-Albite-Epidote facies, Hbl = Hornblende-Hornfels facies, HPX = Hornfels-Pyroxene Facies, San = Sanidinite facies

A pelite (from Ancient Greek πηλός (pēlós) 'clay, earth') or metapelite is a metamorphosed fine-grained sedimentary rock, i.e. mudstone or siltstone. The term was earlier used by geologists to describe a clay-rich, fine-grained clastic sediment or sedimentary rock, i.e. mud or a mudstone, the metamorphosed version of which would technically have been a metapelite. It was equivalent to the now little-used Latin-derived term lutite. A semipelite is defined in part as having similar chemical composition but being of a crystalloblastic nature.

Pettijohn (1975) gives the following descriptive terms based on grain size, avoiding the use of terms such as clay or argillaceous which carry an implication of chemical composition. The Ancient Greek terms are more commonly used for metamorphosed rocks, and the Latin for unmetamorphosed:

Descriptive size terms
Texture	Common	Ancient Greek	Latin
Coarse	gravel(ly)	psephite (psephitic)	rudite (rudaceous)
Medium	sand(y)	psammite (psammitic)	arenite (arenaceous)
Fine	clay(ey)	pelite (pelitic)	lutite (lutaceous)

== Barrovian facies series ==
In the late 1800s and early 1900s, George Barrow discovered the classic Barrovian-type metamorphic sequence in the southeastern Scottish Highlands. It represents a common type of regional pelitic orogenic metamorphism. He observed that as a pelitic rock undergoes higher pressures and temperatures, its mineral assemblage changes from predominantly chlorite to biotite to garnet to staurolite to kyanite to sillimanite. This later turned out to be overly simplistic.
