= Dunderberg Shale =

Geologic formation in Nevada and Utah, United States

- Stratigraphic range: Cambrian
- Type: Formation
- Underlies: Windfall Formation
- Overlies: Bonanza King Formation

Lithology
- Primary: shale
- Other: limestone

Location
- Region: Nevada, Utah
- Country: United States

The Dunderberg Shale is a geologic formation in Nevada and Utah.

It preserves fossils dating back to the Cambrian period.

== See also ==
- List of fossiliferous stratigraphic units in Nevada
- List of fossiliferous stratigraphic units in Utah
- Paleontology in Nevada
- Paleontology in Utah
