= Coosina =

Coosina Temporal range: Dresbachian

Scientific classification
- Kingdom: Animalia
- Phylum: Arthropoda
- Clade: †Artiopoda
- Class: †Trilobita
- Order: †Ptychopariida
- Family: †Crepicephalidae
- Genus: †Coosina; Rasetti, 1956

Extinct genus of trilobite

Coosina is an extinct genus from a well-known class of fossil marine arthropods, the trilobites. It lived from approximately 501 to 490 million years ago during the Dresbachian faunal stage of the late Cambrian Period. It is one of the oldest fossils.
