= Psammite =

General term for sandstone

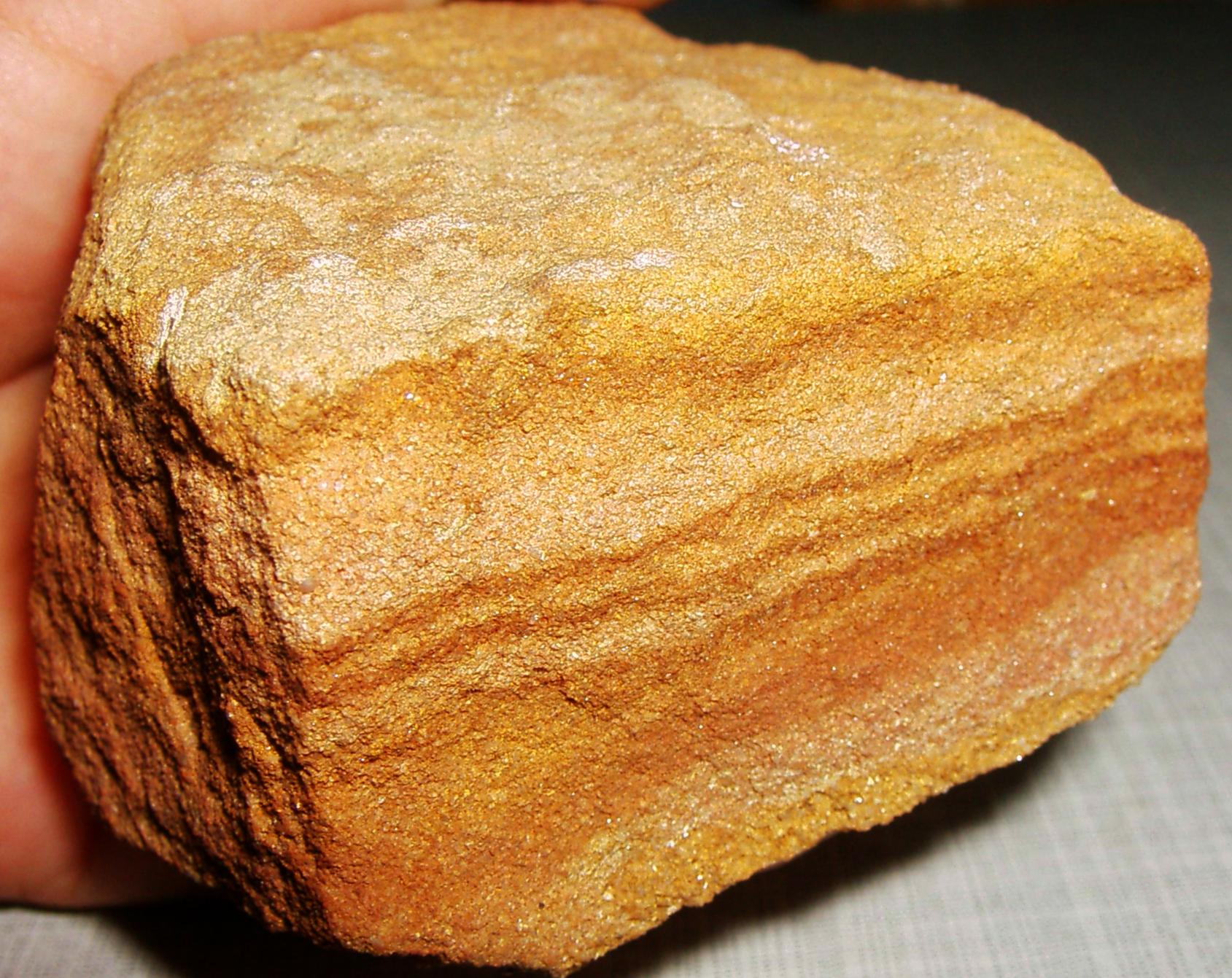

Psammite (Greek: psammitēs "(made) from sand", from psammos "sand") is a general term for sandstone. It is equivalent to the Latin-derived term arenite and is commonly used in various publications to describe a metamorphosed sedimentary rock with a dominantly sandstone protolith. In Europe, this term was formerly used for a fine-grained, fissile, clayey sandstone. Pettijohn gives the following descriptive terms based on grain size, avoiding the use of terms such as "clay" or "argillaceous", which carry an implication of chemical composition:

Descriptive size terms
Texture	Common	Greek	Latin
Coarse	gravel(ly)	psephite (psephitic)	rudite (rudaceous)
Medium	sand(y)	psammite (psammitic)	arenite (arenaceous)
Fine	clay(ey)	pelite (pelitic)	lutite (lutaceous)
