= Calcisiltite =

Type of limestone

Calcisiltite is a type of limestone that is composed predominantly, more than 50 percent, of detrital (transported) silt-size carbonate grains. These grains consist either of the silt-size particles of ooids, fragments of fossil shells, fragments of older limestones and dolomites, intraclasts, pellets, other carbonate grains, or some combination of these. Calcisiltite is the carbonate equivalent of a siltstone. Calcisiltites can accumulate in a wide variety of coastal, lacustrine, and marine environments. It is typically the product of abrasion and bioerosion.

The term calcisiltite was not an original part of the calcilutite, calcarenite and calcirudite classification system for limestones, which Grabau proposed in 1903. Instead, the term calcisiltite was created by Kay in 1951 for limestone consisting predominantly of detrital silt-size, 0.062 to 0.002 mm, grains. As a result, calcisiltite is equivalent to the coarser part of "calcilutite" as it was originally proposed by Grabau and as calcilutite is normally defined and used by geologists. Calcisiltite is the carbonate equivalent of siltstone.
