= Calcirudite =

Type of limestone

Calcirudite is a type of limestone that is composed predominantly, more than 50 percent, of carbonate grains that are larger in size than sand (2 mm in diameter). The grains can consist of either fragments of fossils, fragments of older limestones and dolomites, other carbonate grains, or some combination of these. The term calcirudite was originally proposed in 1903 by Grabau as a part of his calcilutite, calcarenite and calcirudite classification system based upon the size of the detrital grains composing a limestone. Depending on roundness of the grains, calcirudite is the carbonate equivalent of either a breccia, in the case of predominantly angular grains, or conglomerate, in the case of predominantly rounded grains. Calcirudites can accumulate in a wide variety of coastal, lacustrine, and marine environments.

== See also ==
- Calcisiltite
- Coquina
