= Calcarenite =

Type of limestone that is composed predominantly of sand-size grains

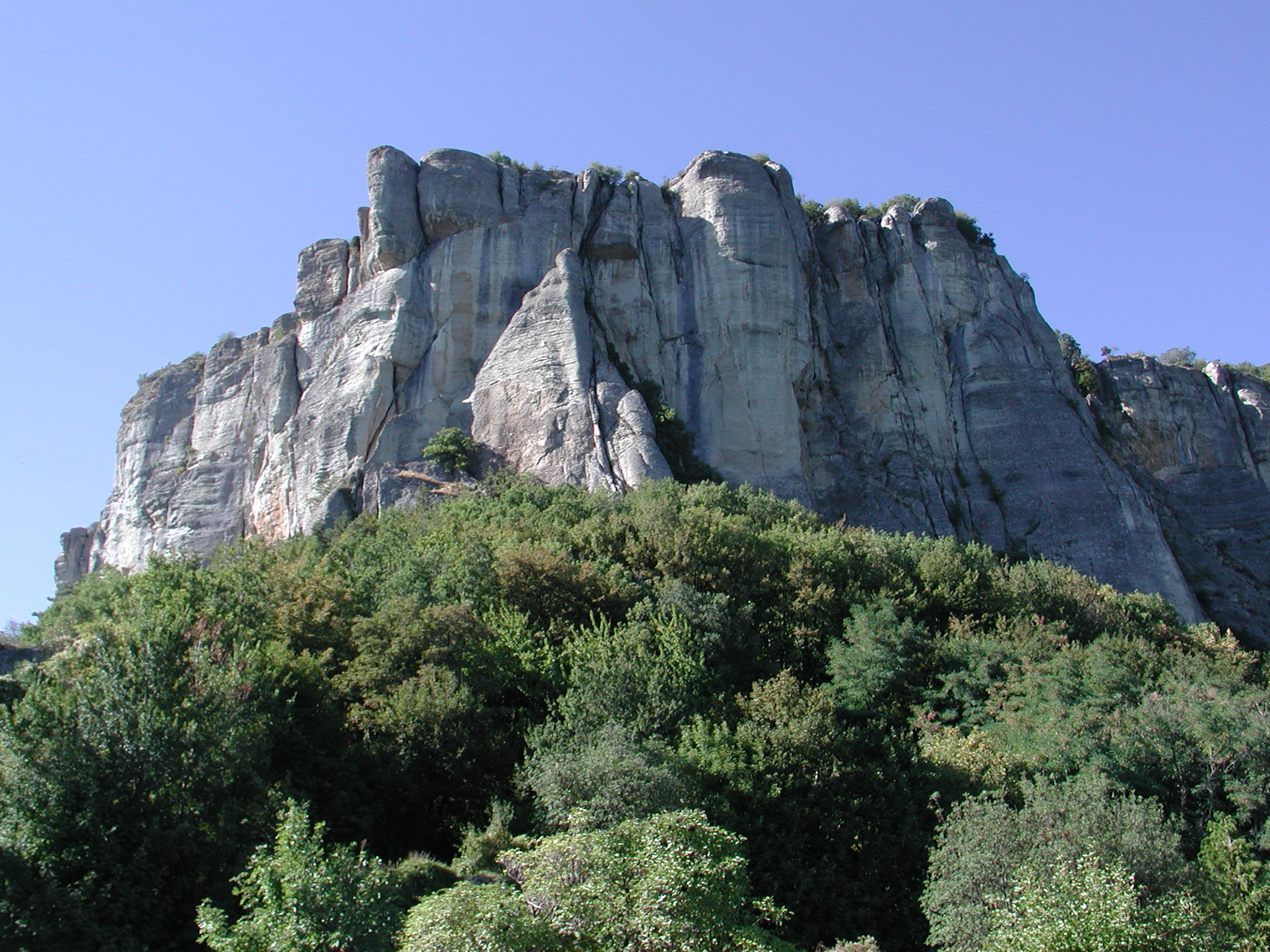
The Pietra di Bismantova in the northern Apennine (Emilia Romagna region, northern Italy) is an example of calcarenite formation.

Calcarenite is a type of limestone that is composed predominantly (more than 50%) of detrital (transported) sand-size (0.0625 to 2 mm in diameter), carbonate grains. The grains consist of sand-size grains of either corals, shells, ooids, intraclasts, pellets, fragments of older limestones and dolomites, other carbonate grains, or some combination of these. Calcarenite is the carbonate equivalent of a sandstone. The term calcarenite was originally proposed in 1903 by Grabau as a part of his calcilutite, calcarenite and calcirudite carbonate classification system based upon the size of the detrital grains composing a limestone. Calcarenites can accumulate in a wide variety of marine and non-marine environments. They can consist of grains of carbonate that have accumulated either as coastal sand dunes (eolianites), beaches, offshore bars and shoals, turbidites, or other depositional settings.

== See also ==
- Calcilutite – Type of limestone
- Calcisiltite – Type of limestone
- Calcirudite – Type of limestone
