= Calcilutite =

Type of limestone

Calcilutite (also known as cementstone) is a type of limestone that is composed of predominantly, more than 50 percent, of either clay-size or both silt-size and clay-size detrital (transported) carbonate grains. These grains consist either of fossil fragments, ooids, intraclasts, pellets, other grains, or some combination of them. The term calcilutite was originally proposed in 1903 by Grabau as a part of his calcilutite, calcarenite and calcirudite classification system based upon the size of the detrital grains composing a limestone. In the original classification of limestone according to the dominant grain-size, calcisiltites were not named and are classified as calcilutite. In this classification, which the majority of geologists follow, a calcilutite consists of both silt- and clay-size, less than 0.062 mm in diameter, grains. It is the carbonate equivalent of a mudstone (not to be confused with a 'mudstone' of the Dunham Limestone classification). Calcilutites can accumulate in a wide variety of marine and lacustrine environments.
