= Intraclasts =

Irregular grains within partially-lithified sediment

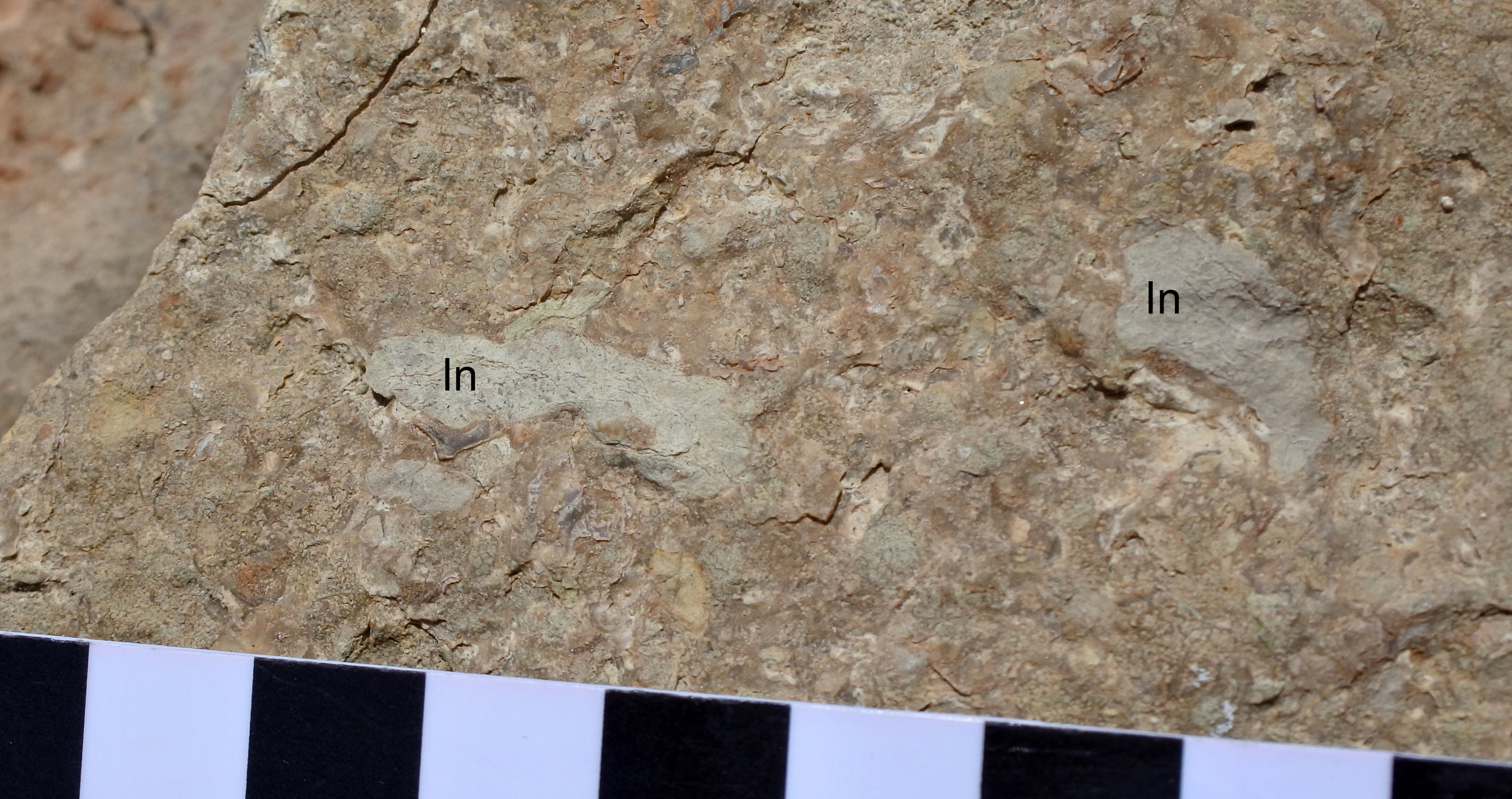
Intraclasts (marked "In") in the Carmel Formation (Middle Jurassic) near Gunlock, Utah.

In geology, intraclasts are irregularly-shaped grains that form by syndepositional erosion (i.e. erosion simultaneous with deposition) of partially-lithified sediment. Gravel grade material is generally composed of whole disarticulated or broken skeletal fragments together with sand grade material of whole, disaggregated and broken skeletal debris. Such sediments can contain fragments of early cemented limestones of local origin which are known as intraclasts.

Extraclasts are sediments that contain pieces of early cemented limestones of extra-basinal origin. Examples of intraclasts include mudlumps that are torn up from the bottoms of lagoons during storms, hardened desiccated mudflakes produced in intertidal and supratidal environments and fragments broken from cemented deep-sea crusts.

Other intraclasts are aggregates of carbonate particles. These include grapestones and botryoidal grains. Grapestones are composite grains with an irregular shape that resembles a bunch of grapes, whereas botryoidal grains are similar to oolitic coats enveloping the aggregate grains. These types of intraclasts form in shoal water environments with intermediate wave and current activity, where grains that are cemented on the sea floor are broken into aggregate fragments and lumps during storms.
