= Heavy mineral analysis =

Heavy minerals (minerals with a density greater than 2.89 g/cm^{3}) have highly variable stabilities with respect to transport/weathering but the combined effects of chemical weathering, transport and diagenesis (and overall maturity) tend to decrease their percentage in the whole rock. Therefore, the average heavy mineral yield in sandstones is about 1% but can be a lot lower in old/recycled sandstones. The individual properties of heavy minerals being very different from one another and their relative abundance being a direct proxy of the nature of the source terranes and transport/recycling mechanism, the analysis of heavy minerals has been used since the 19th century as a provenance tool.

== History ==
The first published provenance analysis is often considered to be the study of the Dutch-Coast sand dunes by J.W. Retgers who combined petrography and chemical analysis of opaque minerals to assess provenance patterns in the basin. This study was followed a year later by the complementary investigations of J.L.C Schroeder Van Der Kolk who used heavy minerals to study the provenance of Quaternary sandstones.

== Separation ==
Heavy minerals are often extracted from large samples (2-4 kg) as they represent a very limited fraction of old and weathered sandstones (less than 1%). Common procedure involves :

- crushing with a jaw-Crusher/mill. To limit the amount of broken grains, the crushing is usually conducted in a "step-by-step" way (bringing the jaws progressively closer and only putting back the larger pieces (>1mm) in the jaw crusher
- The crushing product is then usually sieved at 500, 250 or 125 μm (depending on the method to be used). In most of the original heavy minerals analysis, the 125-64 μm fraction is retained for the separation work as it gives a representative yield of the heavy minerals, makes the mounting easier and allows a more detailed petrographic identification.
- The samples are then repeatedly washed with water and left for decantation to remove the clay fraction
- acid etching to eliminate potential carbonate cements and ferruginous coatings is also common. Preparation uses a low concentration acetic acid (0.000016 M, PH should not be lower than 5), as more concentrated acids or hydrochloric acid may introduce a bias in the heavy mineral content by dissolving the most fragile phases such as apatite or calcic amphibole. If this technique is used, the sample is then boiled with distilled water and dried in an oven (at low temperature to not bring the sample to the closure temperature of some of its minerals).
- The cleaned and dried fraction is then put and stirred in a separation funnel filled with a Heavy Liquid (HL) solution. The most commonly used heavy liquids are bromoform, tetrabromoethane and sodium polytungstate solution.
- Several other tools are available to separate the heavy mineral (i.e. magnetic separators and Wifley tables)

== Popular heavy mineral ratios ==
Among the most used heavy mineral ratios are:

- the ZTR index (Zircon-Tourmaline-Rutile),
- the GZi (Garnet-Zircon index),
- the ATi (Apatite-Tourmaline index),
- the RuZi (Rutile-Zircon index),
- the MZi (Monazite-Zircons index),
- the CZi (Chrome-spinel-Zircon index)
