= Escarpment =

Steep slope or cliff separating two relatively level regions

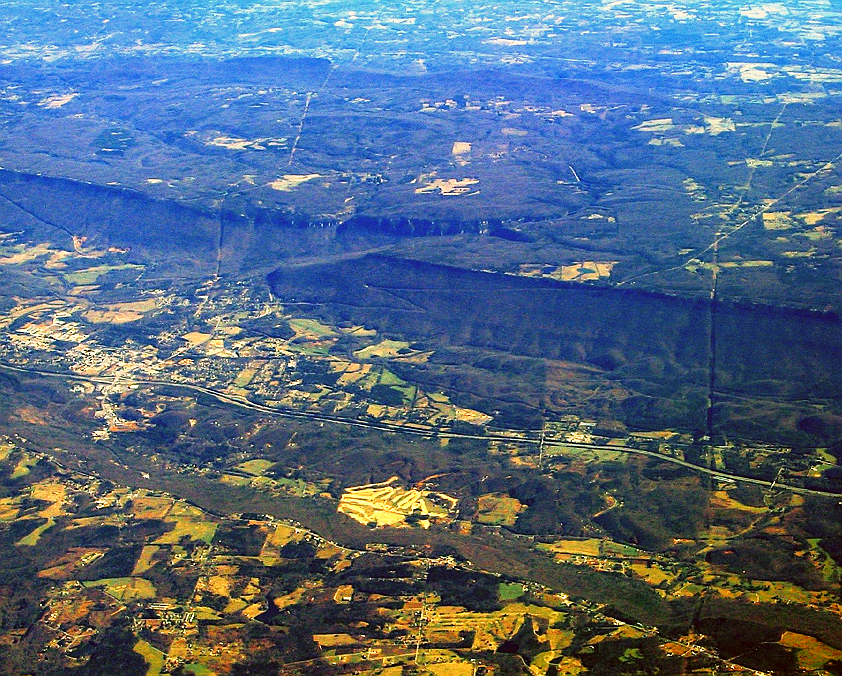
Escarpment face of a cuesta, broken by a fault, overlooking Trenton, Cloudland Canyon State Park, and Lookout Mountain in the U.S. state of Georgia

An escarpment is a steep slope or long cliff that forms as a result of faulting or erosion and separates two relatively level areas having different elevations.

Similarity causes the term scarp to be incorrectly used interchangeably with escarpment, which refers to the margin between two landforms as opposed to scarp, which refers to a cliff or a steep slope. In this usage, an escarpment is a ridge that has a gentle slope on one side and a steep scarp on the other side.

More loosely, the term scarp also describes a zone between a coastal lowland and a continental plateau that shows a marked, abrupt change in elevation caused by coastal erosion at the base of the plateau.

== Formation and description ==
Schematic cross section of a cuesta, dip slopes facing left, and harder rocklayers in darker colors than softer ones

Scarps are generally formed by one of two processes: by differential erosion of sedimentary rocks or by movement of the Earth's crust at a geologic fault. The former is the more common type: the escarpment is a transition from one series of sedimentary rocks to another series of a different age and composition. Escarpments are also frequently formed by faults. When a fault displaces the ground surface so that one side is higher than the other, a fault scarp is created. That can occur in dip-slip faults, a strike-slip fault that brings a piece of high ground adjacent to an area of lower ground.

Earth is not the only planet with escarpments. They are believed to occur on other planets when the crust contracts, as a result of cooling. On other Solar System bodies such as Mercury, Mars, and the Moon, the Latin term rupes is used for an escarpment.

== Erosion ==
When sedimentary beds are tilted and exposed to the surface, erosion and weathering may occur. Escarpments erode gradually and over geological time. The mélange tendencies of escarpments results in varying contacts between a multitude of rock types. The different types of rock weather at different speeds, according to Goldich dissolution series, and so different stages of deformation can often be seen in the layers in which the escarpments have been exposed to the elements.

== See also ==
- Cuesta – Hill or ridge with a gentle slope on one side and a steep slope on the other
- Fall line – Meeting point of uplands and coastal plain
- List of escarpments
