= Provenance (geology) =

Field of research in geology

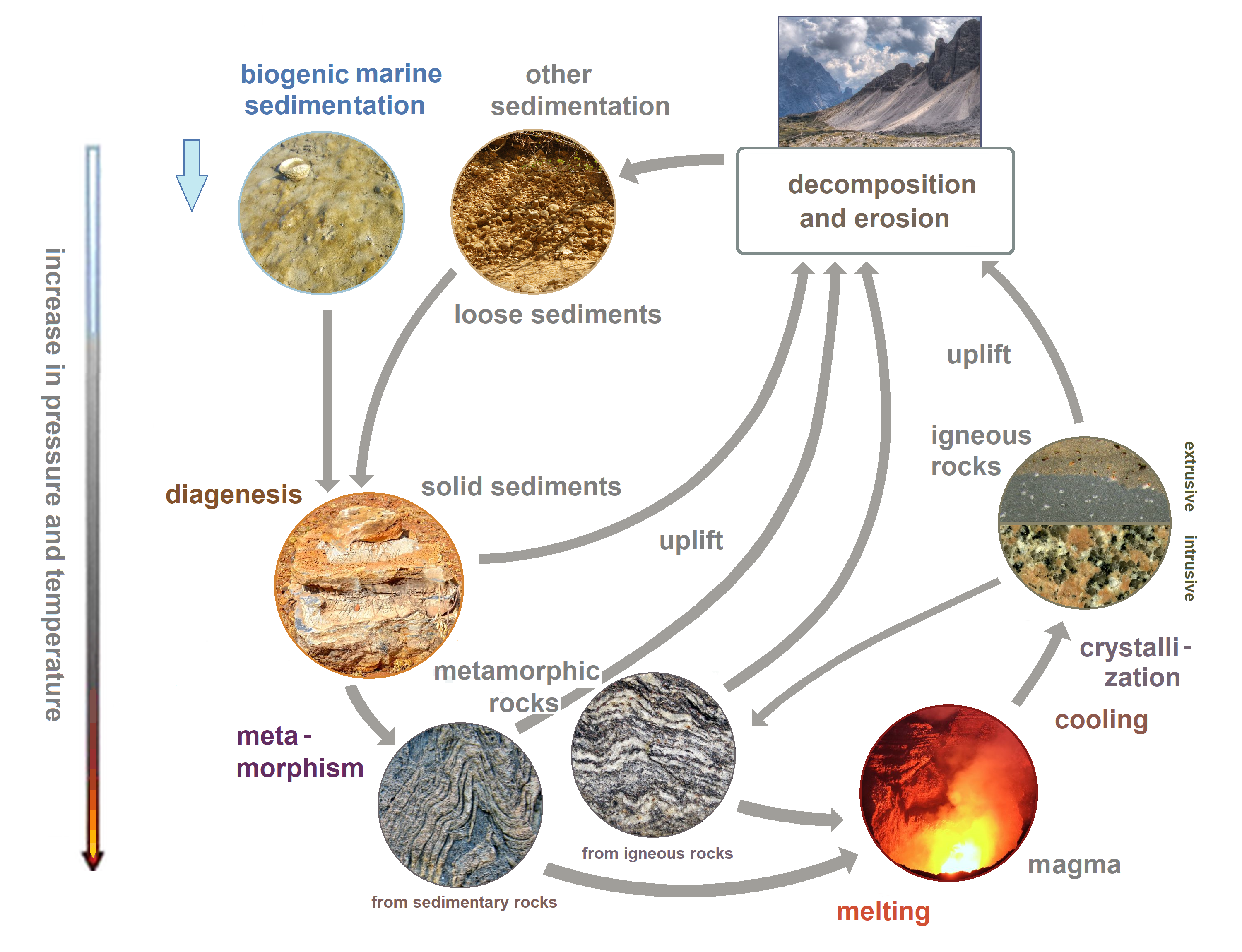
The main rock types

Provenance, also known as geographic attribution, in geology refers to the origins or sources of particles within sediment and sedimentary rocks.

Metamorphic and igneous rocks are broken down via weathering and erosion into sediment as part of the rock cycle. These sediments are transported by wind, water, ice, or gravity, before being deposited in horizontal layers. As more sediment is deposited over time, earlier layers are covered and compacted. Finally, they are cemented to form a new rock.

Modern geological provenance research specifically refers to the application of compositional analyses to determine sedimental origins. This is often used in conjunction with the study of exhumation histories, forward-modeling of paleo-earth systems, and interpretation of drainage networks and their evolution. In combination, these help to characterize the "source to sink" journey of clastic sediments from the hinterland to a sedimentary basin. Sediments analyzed for provenance can provide tectonic, paleogeographic, and paleoclimatic histories.

Provenance studies are conducted to investigate scientific questions such as the growth history of the continental crust, the collision history of the Indian and Asian tectonic plates, Asian monsoon intensity, and Himalayan exhumation.

== Background ==
=== Etymology ===
Provenance (from French provenir 'to come from/forth') describes in detail the history of a certain object, with respect to its creation, ownership, custody, and location. The term is commonly used by art historians and archivists, who use it to authenticate a work, document, or other significant object.

=== History ===
The study of sedimentary provenance involves several geological disciplines, including mineralogy, geochemistry, geochronology, sedimentology, and petrology. The development of provenance methods occurred alongside development of these mainstream geological disciplines.

The earliest provenance studies were based on paleocurrent and petrographic analysis (composition and texture of sandstone and conglomerate). In the 1970s, provenance studies expanded to include tectonic settings (i.e. magmatic arcs, collision orogens, and continental blocks) using sandstone composition. Similarly, bulk-rock geochemistry techniques were applied to interpret provenance, linking geochemical signatures to source rocks and tectonic settings.

In the 1980s, advancements in chemical and isotopic microanalysis methods continued. Inductively coupled plasma mass spectrometry (ICP-MS) and sensitive high-resolution ion microprobe (SHRIMP) enabled researchers to analyze single mineral grains.

=== Purpose ===
The goal of sedimentary provenance studies is to reconstruct and interpret the history of sediment from parent rocks at a source area to detritus at a burial place, to investigate the characteristics of a source area by analyzing the composition and texture of sediments. Sedimentary provenance analysis can also be a powerful tool to track landscape evolution and changes in sediment dispersal pathways through time.

In Petrology of Sedimentary Rocks (1992), Boggs described the four main goals of provenance studies as follows:

1. "source(s) of the particles that make up the rocks
2. erosion and transport mechanisms that moved the particles from source areas to depositional sites
3. depositional setting and depositional processes responsible for sedimentation of the particles (the depositional environment),
4. physical and chemical conditions of the burial environment and diagenetic changes that occur in siliciclastic sediment during burial and uplift"

== Sediment path ==
=== Sources ===
All exposed rocks are subjected to physical or chemical weathering. They are broken down into finer-grained sediments. Igneous, sedimentary, and metamorphic rocks can all serve as sources for detritus.

=== Transportation ===
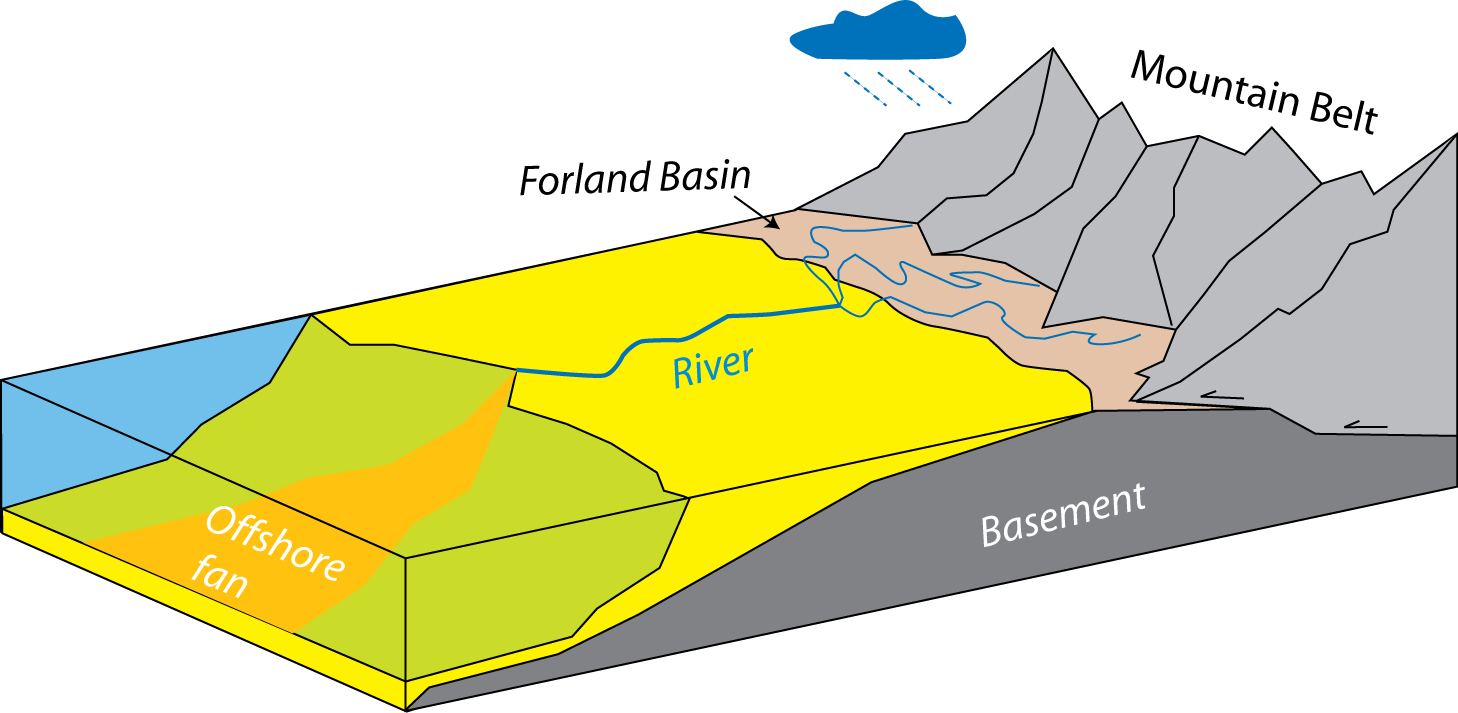
Distribution of detritus

Rocks are transported downstream from higher to lower elevations. Source rocks and detritus are transported by gravity, water, wind, or glacial movement. The transportation process breaks rocks into smaller particles by physical abrasion, from boulder size into sand or even clay. At the same time minerals within the sediment can also be changed chemically. Only minerals that are more resistant to chemical weathering can survive (e.g. ultrastable minerals such as zircon, tourmaline, and rutile). During transportation, minerals can be sorted by their density, and as a result, light minerals (such as quartz and mica) will be moved faster and further than heavy minerals (such as zircon and tourmaline).

=== Accumulation ===
After a certain distance of transportation, detritus reaches a sedimentary basin and accumulates in one place. With the accumulation of sediments, they are buried to a deeper level and go through diagenesis, which turns separate sediments into sedimentary rocks (i.e. conglomerate, sandstone, mudrocks, limestone, etc.) and some metamorphic rocks (such as quartzite) which were derived from sedimentary rocks. After sediments are weathered and eroded from mountain belts, they can be carried by streams and deposited along rivers as river sands. Detritus can also be transported and deposited in foreland basins and offshore fans. The detrital record can be collected from all these places and can be used in provenance studies.

Examples of detritus accumulation
Detritus Type	Depositional environment	Location	Coordinates	Reference
Loess sand	Loess	Loess Plateau	38.4°N 108.4°E	
Detrital apatite	Continental margin	East Greenland Margin	63.5°N 39.7°W	
Detrital zircon	Modern river	Red River	22.56°N 103.88°E	
Heavy mineral	Accretionary complex	South-central Alaska	61.00°N 149.70°W	
Detrital zircon	Ancient passive continental margin	Southern Lhasa terrane	29.25°N 85.25°E	
Detrital zircon	Foreland basin	Nepal Himalayan foreland basin	27.86°N 83.56°E	

=== Reworking of detritus ===
After detritus is eroded from a source area, it is transported and deposited in river, foreland basin, or flood plain. Then the detritus can be eroded and transported again when flooding or other kinds of eroding events occur. This process is called as reworking of detritus and could be problematic to provenance studies. For example, U-Pb zircon ages are generally considered to reflect the time of zircon crystallization at about 750 °C. Zircon is resistant to physical abrasion and chemical weathering; so, zircon grains can survive multiple cycles of reworking. This means that if the zircon grain is reworked (re-eroded) from a foreland basin, and not from original mountain-belt source area, it will lose information of reworking (the detrital record will not indicate the foreland basin as a source area but will indicate the earlier mountain belt as the source). To avoid this problem, samples can be collected close to the mountain front, upstream from which there is no significant sediment storage.

== Provenance methods ==
Generally, provenance methods can be sorted into two categories: petrological methods and geochemical methods.

=== Petrological methods ===
Examples of petrological methods include QFL ternary diagram, heavy mineral assemblages (apatite–tourmaline index, garnet zircon index), clay mineral assemblages and illite crystallinity, reworked fossils and palynomorphs, and stock magnetic properties.

=== Geochemical methods ===
Examples of geochemical methods include zircon U-Pb dating (plus Hf isotope), zircon fission track, apatite fission track, bulk sediment Nd and Sr isotopes, garnet chemistry, pyroxene chemistry, and amphibole chemistry. See the summary table below for various types of provenance methods.

=== Plate tectonics ===
This method has the ability to link sandstone composition to tectonic setting. This method is described in the 1979 Dickinson and Suczek paper.

=== Resolving provenance problems by dating detrital minerals ===
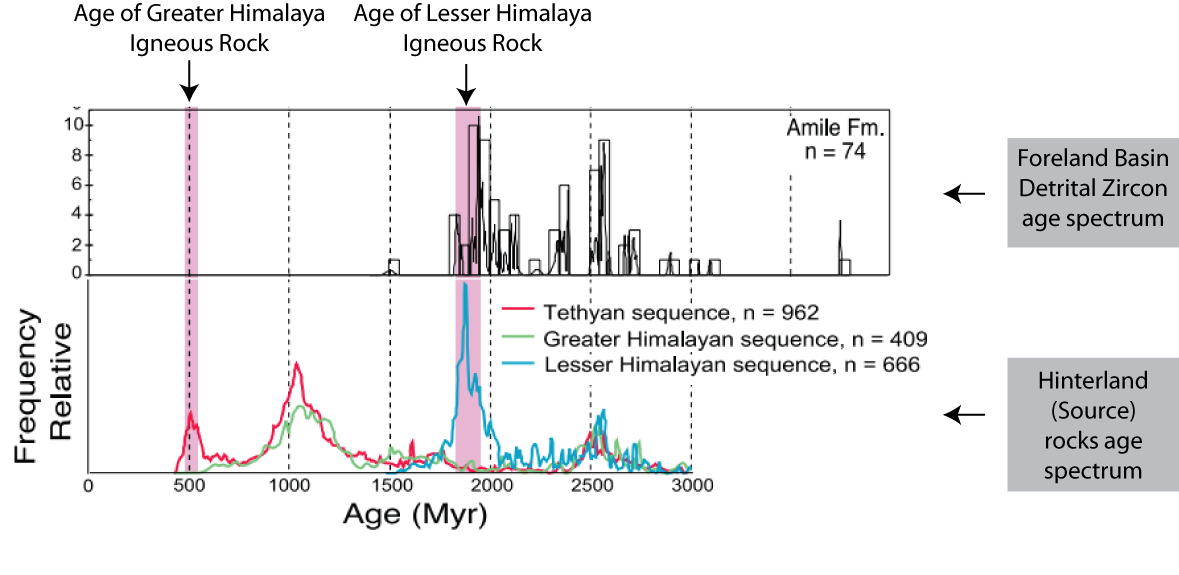
An example of U–Pb relative age probability diagram

Geochronology and thermochronology have been applied to solve provenance and tectonic problems. Detrital minerals used in this method include zircon, monazite, white mica, and apatite. The ages dated from these minerals indicate the timing of crystallization and multiple tectono-thermal events. This method is based on the following considerations: "(1) the source areas are characterized by rocks with different tectonic histories recorded by distinctive crystallization and cooling ages; (2) the source rocks contain the selected mineral;" and (3) a detrital mineral such as zircon is ultra-stable, which means it is capable of surviving multiple phases of physical and chemical weathering, erosion, and deposition. This property make these detrital minerals ideal to record long histories of crystallization of tectonically complex source areas.

The figure to the right is an example of U–Pb relative age probability diagram. The upper plot shows foreland basin detrital zircon age distribution. The lower plot shows hinterland (source area) zircon age distribution. In the plots, n is the number of analyzed zircon grains. So for foreland basin Amile formation, 74 grains are analyzed. For source area (divided into 3 tectonic level, Tethyan Himalaya, Greater Himalaya and Lesser Himalaya), 962, 409 and 666 grains are analyzed respectively. To correlate hinterland and foreland data, let's see the source area record first, Tethyan sequence have age peak at ~500 Myr, 1000 Myr and 2600 Myr, Greater Himalaya has age peaks at ~1200 Myr and 2500 Myr, and Lesser Himalaya sequence has age peaks at ~1800 Ma and 2600 Ma. By simply comparing the foreland basin record with source area record, we cam see that Amile formation resemble age distribution of Lesser Himalaya. It has about 20 grains with age ~1800 Myr (Paleoproterozoic) and about 16 grains yield age of ~2600 Myr (Archean). Then we can interpret that sediments of Amile formation are mainly derived from the Lesser Himalaya, and rocks yield ago of Paleoproterozoic and Archean are from the Indian craton. So the story is: Indian plate collide with Tibet, rocks of Indian craton deformed and involved into Himalayan thrust belt (e.g. Lesser Himalaya sequence), then eroded and deposited at foreland basin.

The U–Pb geochronology of zircons was conducted by laser-ablated, multicollector, inductively-coupled plasma mass spectrometry (LA-MC-ICPMS).

=== Bulk sediment Nd and Sr ===
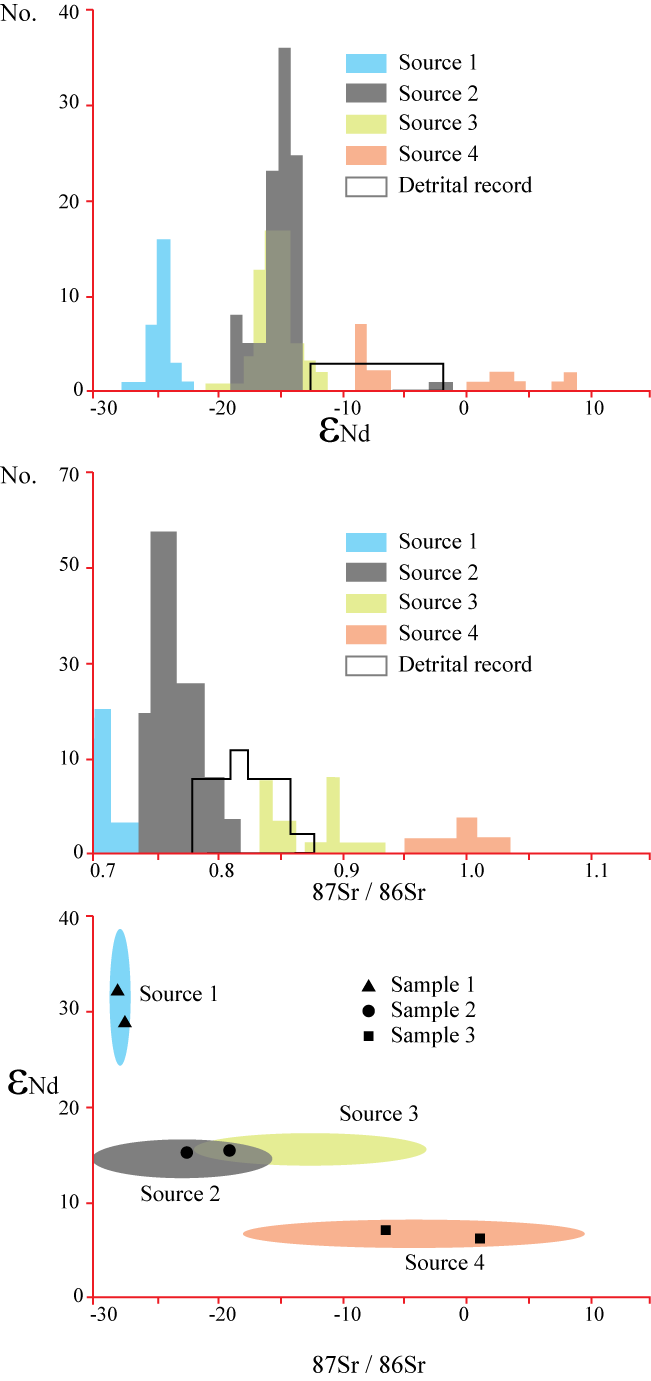
An example of Nd and Sr isotopic data plots which are used in provenance studies

The properties of the samarium–neodymium dating (Sm–Nd) radioactive isotope system can provide age estimations of sedimentary source rocks; the system has been used in provenance studies. ^{143}Nd is produced by α decay of ^{147}Sm and has a half-life of 1.06×10^{11} years. A variation of ^{143}Nd/^{144}Nd is caused by the decay of ^{147}Sm. Now the Sm/Nd ratio of Earth's mantle is higher than that of its crust and the ^{143}Nd/^{144}Nd ratio is also higher in the mantle than in the crust. The ^{143}Nd/^{144}Nd ratio is expressed in εNd notation (DePaolo and Wasserbur 1976).

$\epsilon Nd = 10^4 \left[\frac{^143Nd/^144Nd_{sample} (T)}{^143Nd/^144Nd_{CHUR}(T)}-1 \right]$,

where CHUR refers to the Chondritic Uniform Reservoir. So, ϵNd is a function of T (time).

The Nd isotope evolution in the mantle and crust is shown in the figure to the right. The bold line in the upper plot shows the evolution of the bulk earth or CHUR. The lower plot shows the evolution of bulk earth (CHUR) in the crust and mantle; 143Nd/144Nd is transformed to εNd. Normally, most rocks have εNd values in the range of -20 to +10. Calculated εNd value of rocks can be correlated to source rocks to perform provenance studies. In addition, Sr and Nd isotopes have been used to study both provenance and weathering intensity. Nd is mainly unaffected by weathering processes, but the 87Sr/86Sr value is more affected by chemical weathering.

=== Summary ===
Provenance study methods are also listed in the table below:

Method	Case studies	
Zircon U–Pb dating		Determine detrital zircon age of crystallization
Zircon U–Pb plus Hf isotopes		εHf(t) > 0, Granite melts formed by the melting of young crust recently formed from depleted mantle generates zircons with radiogenic initial Hf isotopic compositions similar to that of their mantle source; εHf(t) < 0, Felsic melts derived from melting of reworked, old continental crust generates zircons with unradiogenic initial Hf isotope ratios.
Apatite fission track		Thermochronological age (when mineral pass closure temperature).
Zircon fission track		Thermochronological age, crystallization age, lag time (thermochronological age minus the depositional age)
Zircon He and U–Pb double dating		"This method gives both the high temperature (~900C) U–Pb crystallization and low temperature (~180C) (U–Th)/He exhumation ages for the same zircon."
Bulk sediment Nd and Sr		Nd model age, ultimate protolith or source area
Bulk sediment Pb isotopes		Complicated Pb isotopes systematics makes it powerful tool to exam a source rock's geologic history especially in ancient heritage.
Heavy mineral assemblages (apatite-tourmaline index, garnet zircon index)		Heavy mineral assemblage of sedimentary rock is a function of the source rock type. For example, kyanite and sillimanite assemblage-rich indicates high-grade metamorphic source rocks
Garnet geochemistry		N/A
Ar–Ar mica dating		Indicate time of mica cooling through Ar-Ar closure temperature due to exhumation.
Nd isotopes in apatite		Nd model age (reference), ultimate protolith or source area.
Pyroxene chemistry		Variable chemistry composition Ca-Mg-Fe indicative of source magma and source rock.
Amphibole chemistry		Major and trace element analyses of amphibole grains are used to provenance studies.
Pb isotopes in K-feldspar		N/A
Clay mineralogy (assemblages and illite crystallinity)		Original abundance of clay minerals in source determines the assemblege distribution in detrital record. The weathering and change of chemical composition also affect distribution.
Monazite U–Pb dating		Determine detrital monozite mineral age of crystallization.
Heavy mineral stability during diagenesis	N/A	N/A
Bulk sediment trace element chemistry		More sensitive indicators of geological processes than major elements
Rutile U-Pb	N/A	Determine detrital rutile mineral age of crystallization
U–Pb detrital titanite		Determine detrital titanite age of crystallization
Zircon REE and Th/U		Zircon grain derived from different types of granite can be discriminated by their REE ratios.
Reworked fossils and palynomorphs		Use reworked fossil (caused by compression, heating, oxidation, microbial attack) and Palynomorphs (plant or animal structure, resistance to decay, sporopollenin chitin to find where sediment derived from.
Bulk sediment Ar–Ar		age of a mineral or whole rock cooled below closure temperature.
Quartz equivalent series resistance(ESR)		Use ESR intensity to correlate detrital record with source rock.
Rock magnetic properties		Substitute or supplement geochemical provenance data, using magnetic susceptibility, hysteresis loops, theromagnetic curves and iron-oxide mineral petrography to correlate sediment with source area.

== Analysis methods and instruments ==
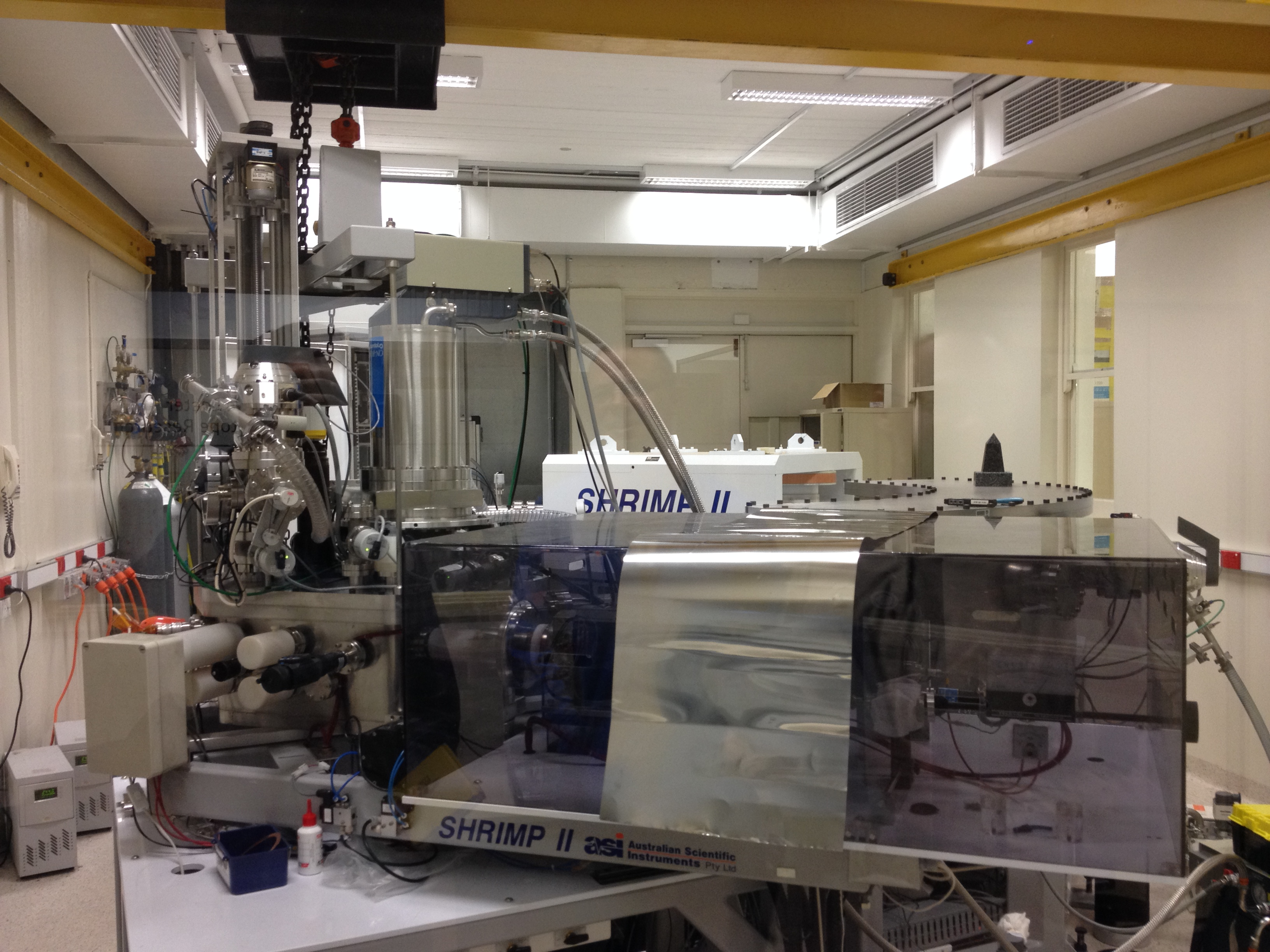
Sensitive High Resolution Ion Microprobe (SHRIMP II) at Curtin University, Western Australia

Selection of instruments and methods for sediment provenance are informed by grain size.

For conglomerates and boulders, where original mineral paragenesis is preserved, almost all analytical methods can be used. For finer-grained sediments, where loss of paragenetic information is a concern, only a limited range of analytical methods are appropriate.

Data acquisition approaches for provenance study fall into the following three categories: (1) analyzing bulk composition to extract petrographic, mineralogical, and chemical information; (2) analyzing specific groups of minerals such as heavy minerals; and (3) analyzing single mineral grains for morphological, chemical, and isotopic properties.

For bulk composition analysis, samples are crushed, powdered, and disintegrated, or melted. Then, measurement of major and trace and rare-earth elements (REE) are conducted by using methods such as atomic absorption spectroscopy (AAS), X-ray fluorescence (XRF), neutron activation analysis (NAA), etc.

Sand-sized sediments can be analyzed by single-grain methods, which can be divided into the following three groups:

1. Microscopic-morphological techniques, which are used to observe shape, color and internal structures in minerals. For example, using a scanning electron microscope (SEM) and cathodoluminescence (CL) detector.
2. Single grain geochemical techniques, which are used to discern chemical composition and variations within minerals. For example, laser-ablation inductively coupled plasma mass spectrometry (ICP-MS).
3. Radiometric dating of a single-grain mineral, a method that can determine the geochronological and thermochronological properties of minerals. For example, U/Pb SHRIMP dating and 40Ar/39Ar laser-probe dating.

== Limitations of provenance studies ==
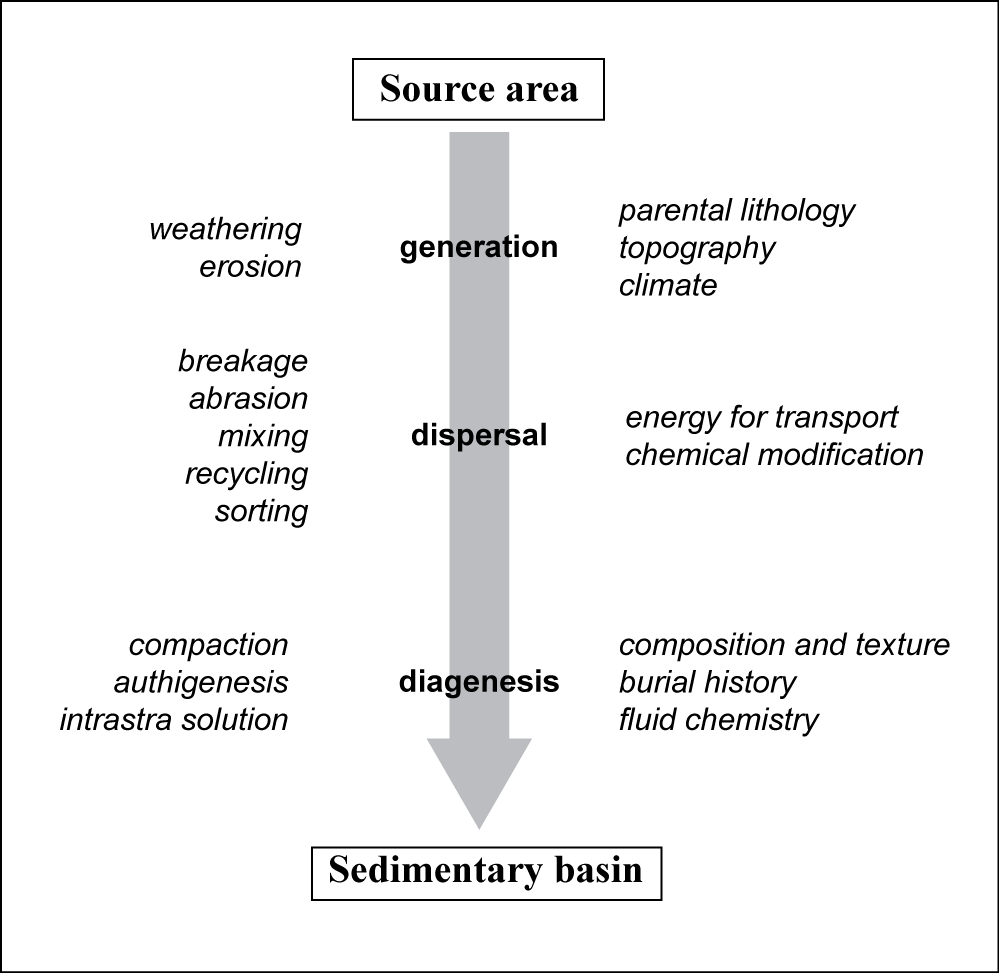
Main steps (middle), modification processes (right) and controlling factors (left) of sediment evolution.

During transportation from the source area to the basin, detritus is subject to weathering, mixing, deposition, diagenesis, and recycling. This complex set of factors can modify parent lithology, both compositionally and textually.

The following sections introduce the major problems and limitations of provenance studies.

=== Candidate source area ===
To correlate sediments (detrital record) to source area, several possible source areas need to be chosen for comparison. Sediment source areas may be missed during site selection and thus not chosen as a candidate source area. This can cause misinterpretation in correlating sediment to source.

=== Grain size ===
Grain size could cause misinterpretation in provenance studies. During transportation and deposition, detritus is subject to mechanical breakdown, chemical alternation, and sorting. This results in a preferential enrichment of specific materials in a certain range of grain-size, and sediment composition tends to be a function of grain size. For instance, SiO_{2}/Al_{2}O_{3} ratios decrease with decreasing grain size because Al-rich phyllosilicate enriches at the expense of Si-rich phase in fine-grained detritus. This means the changing of composition of the detrital record could reflect the effects of grain size sorting and not only changing of provenance. To minimize the influence of sedimentary sorting on provenance method (like Sr-Nd isotopic method), only very-fine-grained-to-fine-grained sandstones are collected as samples. Medium-grained sandstones can be used when alternatives are unavailable.

=== Mixing of detritus ===
Mixing of detritus from multiple sources may cause problems in correlating the final detrital record to source rocks, especially when dispersal pathways are complex and involve the recycling of previously deposited sediments. For example, if a detrital record contains zircon grains that are one billion years old are transported by rivers flowing through two source areas containing zircons of the same age, it would not be possible to determine which of the two upstream source areas was the source of the zircon detritus.

=== Diagenesis ===
Diagenesis could be a problem when analyzing detrital records, especially when dealing with ancient sediments, which are always lithified. The variation of clay minerals in a detrital record may not reflect variation in provenance rock, but rather a burial effect. For example, clay minerals become unstable at great depth: kaolinite and smectite become illite. If there is a reduction in illite components in a drilling core, the record does not necessarily show more illite-yielding source rock, because it could also be as a result of burial and alternation of minerals.

=== Hinterland structural assumption ===
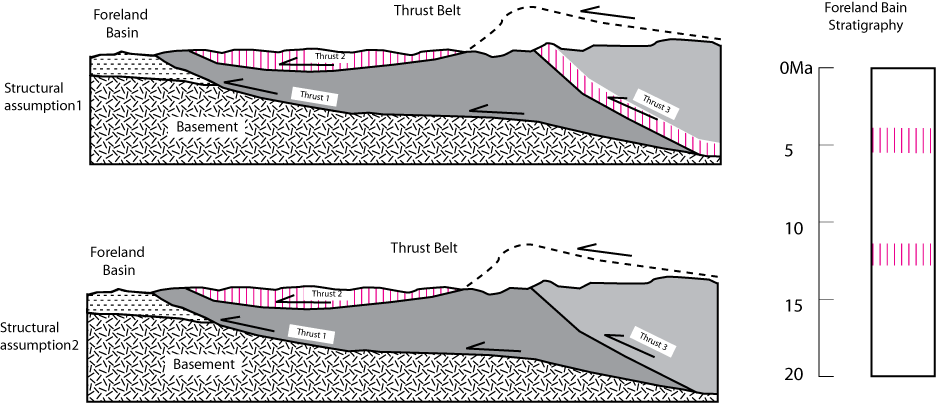
Structural assumption influence on provenance interpretation. The two cross sections on the left show two hinterland structural assumptions, and the column on the right is a foreland basin stratigraphy which shows variations of detrital record. Ma = million years.

Provenance study tries to correlate detrital record (which is stored in basins) to hinterland stratigraphy. Hinterland stratigraphy is structurally controlled by fault systems, so the hinterland structural setting is important to interpretation of the detrital record. Hinterland structural setting is estimated by field mapping work. Geologists work along river valleys and traverse mountain belts (thrust belt), locate major faults, and describe major stratigraphy bounded by faults in the area. A geologic map is the product of field mapping work, and cross-sections can be constructed by interpreting a geologic map. However, hinterland structural settings are not definite, but rather are assumptions based on the best available data.

For example, the figure shows a classic thrust belt and foreland basin system. The thrust fault carries overlying rocks to the surface and rocks of various lithology are eroded and transported to be deposited at the foreland basin. In structural assumption 1, the pink layer is assumed to exist above thrust 2 and thrust 3, but in structural assumption 2, the pink layer is only carried by thrust 2. Detrital records are stored in foreland basin stratigraphy. Within that stratigraphy, the pink layer is correlated to the hinterland pink layer. If we use structural assumption 2, we can interpret that thrust 2 was active about 5 and 12 million years ago. But when using the other assumption, we couldn't know if the pink layer record indicates activity of thrust 2 or 3.

== Applications ==
Provenance methods are used in the oil and gas industry. "Relations between provenance and basin are important for hydrocarbon exploration because sand frameworks of contrasting detrital compositions respond differently to diagenesis, and thus display different trends of porosity reduction with depth of burial."

A combination of multiple provenance methods (e.g. petrography, heavy mineral analysis, mineral geochemistry, wholerock geochemistry, geochronology, and drainage capture analysis) can provide valuable insights for hydrocarbon exploration and production. In the exploration stage, provenance studies can enhance the understanding of reservoir distribution and reservoir quality. In the development stage, mineralogical and chemical techniques are used to estimate reservoir zonation and correlation of stratigraphy. Provenance techniques are also used in the production stage. For example, such techniques are used to assess permeability variations and well-decline rate resulting from spatial variability in diagenesis and depositional facies.

== See also ==
- Uranium–lead dating
- Petrology
- Mineralogy
- Heavy mineral
