= Sandstone =

Type of sedimentary rock

- Sedimentary rock
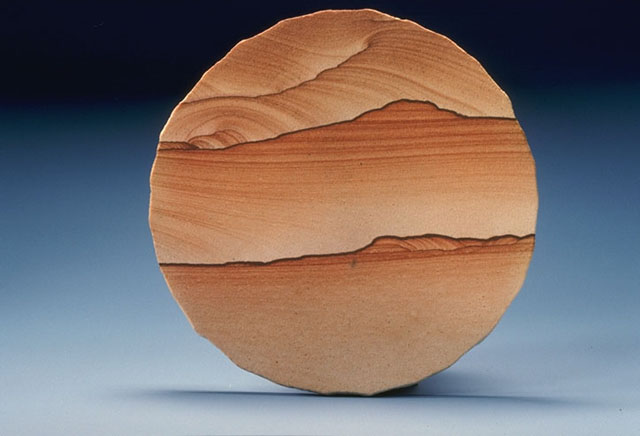
- Cut slab of sandstone

Composition
- Typically quartz and feldspar; lithic fragments are also common. Other minerals may be found in particularly mature sandstone.

Sandstone is a clastic sedimentary rock composed mainly of sand-sized (0.0625 to 2 mm) silicate grains, cemented together by other minerals. Sandstones comprise about 20–25% of all sedimentary rocks.

Most sandstone is composed of quartz or feldspar because they are the most resistant minerals to the weathering processes at the Earth's surface. Like uncemented sand, sandstone may be imparted any color by impurities within the minerals, but the most common colors are tan, brown, yellow, red, grey, pink, white, and black. Because sandstone beds can form highly visible cliffs and other topographic features, certain colors of sandstone have become strongly identified with certain regions, such as the red rock deserts of Arches National Park and other areas of the American Southwest.

Rock formations composed of sandstone usually allow the percolation of water and other fluids and are porous enough to store large quantities, making them valuable aquifers and petroleum reservoirs.

Quartz-bearing sandstone can be changed into quartzite through metamorphism, usually related to tectonic compression within orogenic belts.

== Origins ==
Sandstones are clastic in origin (as opposed to either organic, like chalk and coal, or chemical, like gypsum and jasper). The silicate sand grains from which they form are the product of physical and chemical weathering of bedrock. Weathering and erosion are most rapid in areas of high relief, such as volcanic arcs, areas of continental rifting, and orogenic belts.

Eroded sand is transported by rivers or by the wind from its source areas to depositional environments where tectonics has created accommodation space for sediments to accumulate. Forearc basins tend to accumulate sand rich in lithic grains and plagioclase. Intracontinental basins and grabens along continental margins are also common environments for deposition of sand.

As sediments continue to accumulate in the depositional environment, older sand is buried by younger sediments, and it undergoes diagenesis. This mostly consists of compaction and lithification of the sand. Early stages of diagenesis, described as eogenesis, take place at shallow depths (a few tens of meters) and are characterized by bioturbation and mineralogical changes in the sands, with only slight compaction. The red hematite that gives red bed sandstones their color is likely formed during eogenesis. Deeper burial is accompanied by mesogenesis, during which most of the compaction and lithification takes place.

Compaction takes place as the sand comes under increasing pressure from overlying sediments. Sediment grains move into more compact arrangements, ductile grains (such as mica grains) are deformed, and pore space is reduced. In addition to this physical compaction, chemical compaction may take place via pressure solution. Points of contact between grains are under the greatest strain, and the strained mineral is more soluble than the rest of the grain. As a result, the contact points are dissolved away, allowing the grains to come into closer contact.

Lithification follows closely on compaction, as increased temperatures at depth hasten deposition of cement that binds the grains together. Pressure solution contributes to cementing, as the mineral dissolved from strained contact points is redeposited in the unstrained pore spaces.

Mechanical compaction takes place primarily at depths less than 1,000 meters (3,300 ft). Chemical compaction continues to depths of 2,000 meters (6,600 ft), and most cementation takes place at depths of 2,000–5,000 meters (6,600–16,400 ft).

Unroofing of buried sandstone is accompanied by telogenesis, the third and final stage of diagenesis. As erosion reduces the depth of burial, renewed exposure to meteoric water produces additional changes to the sandstone, such as dissolution of some of the cement to produce secondary porosity.

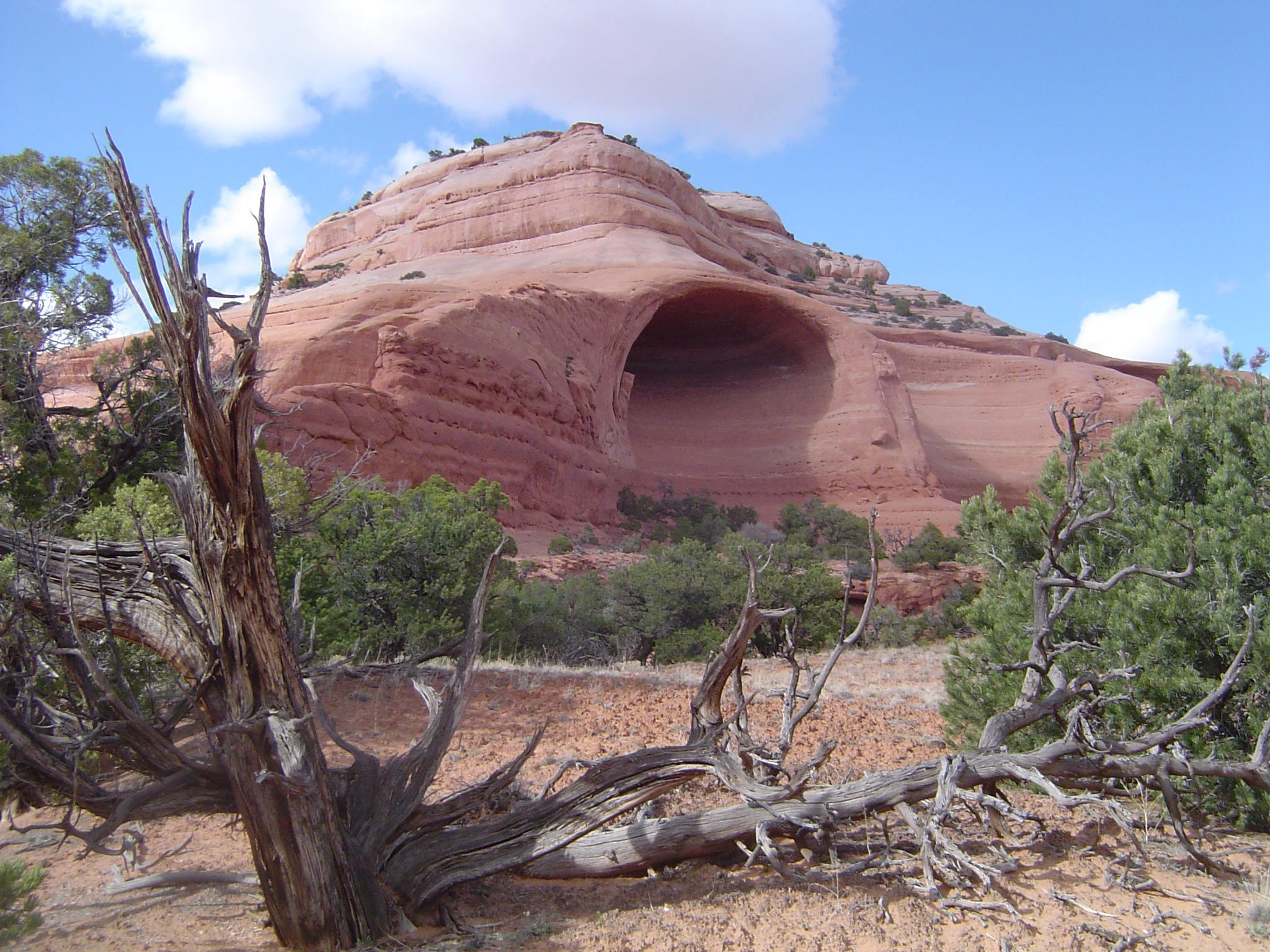
Alcove in the Navajo Sandstone

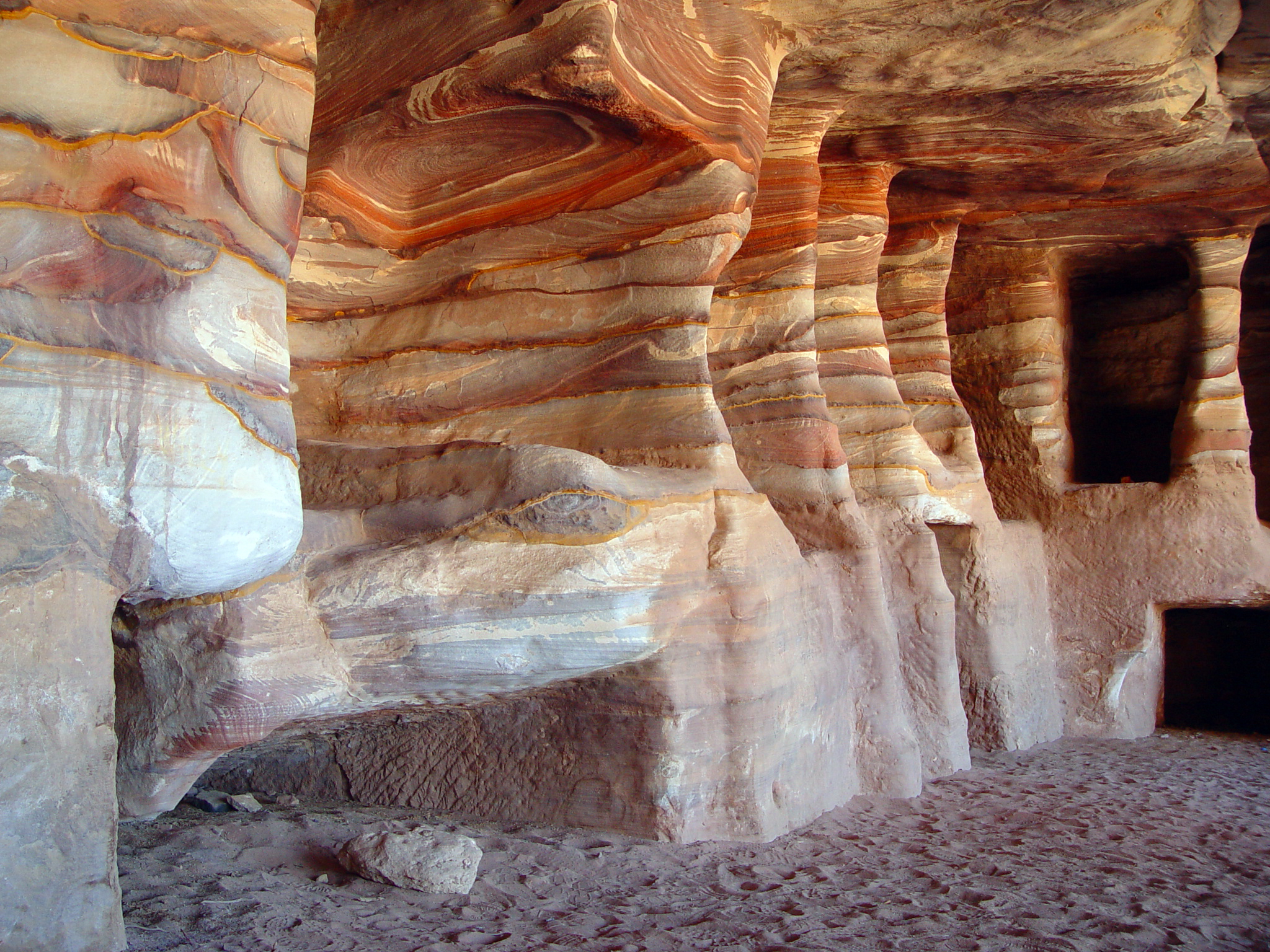
Kokh-type tombs cut into the multicoloured sandstone of Petra

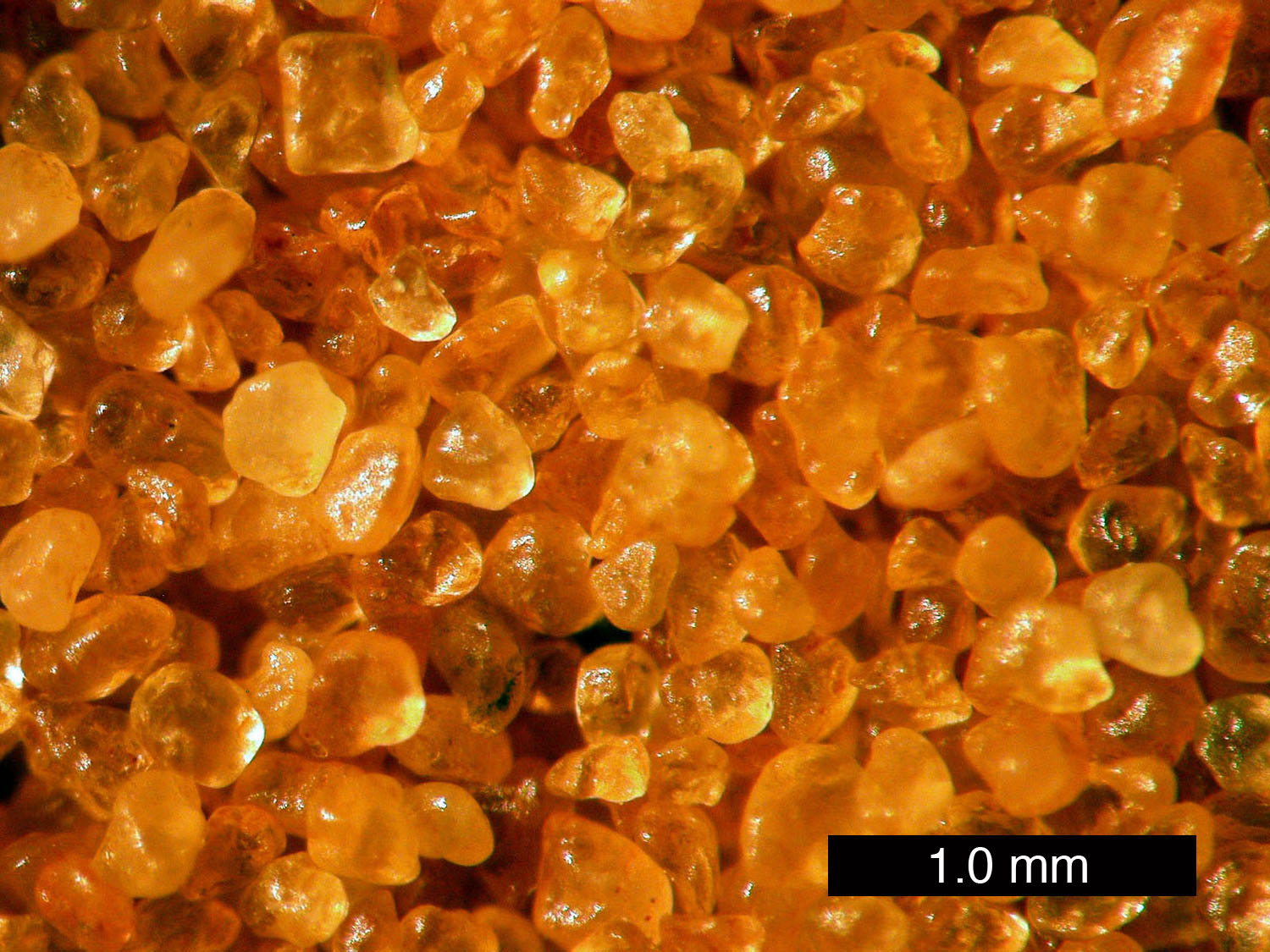
Sand grains of quartz with hematite coating providing an orange colour

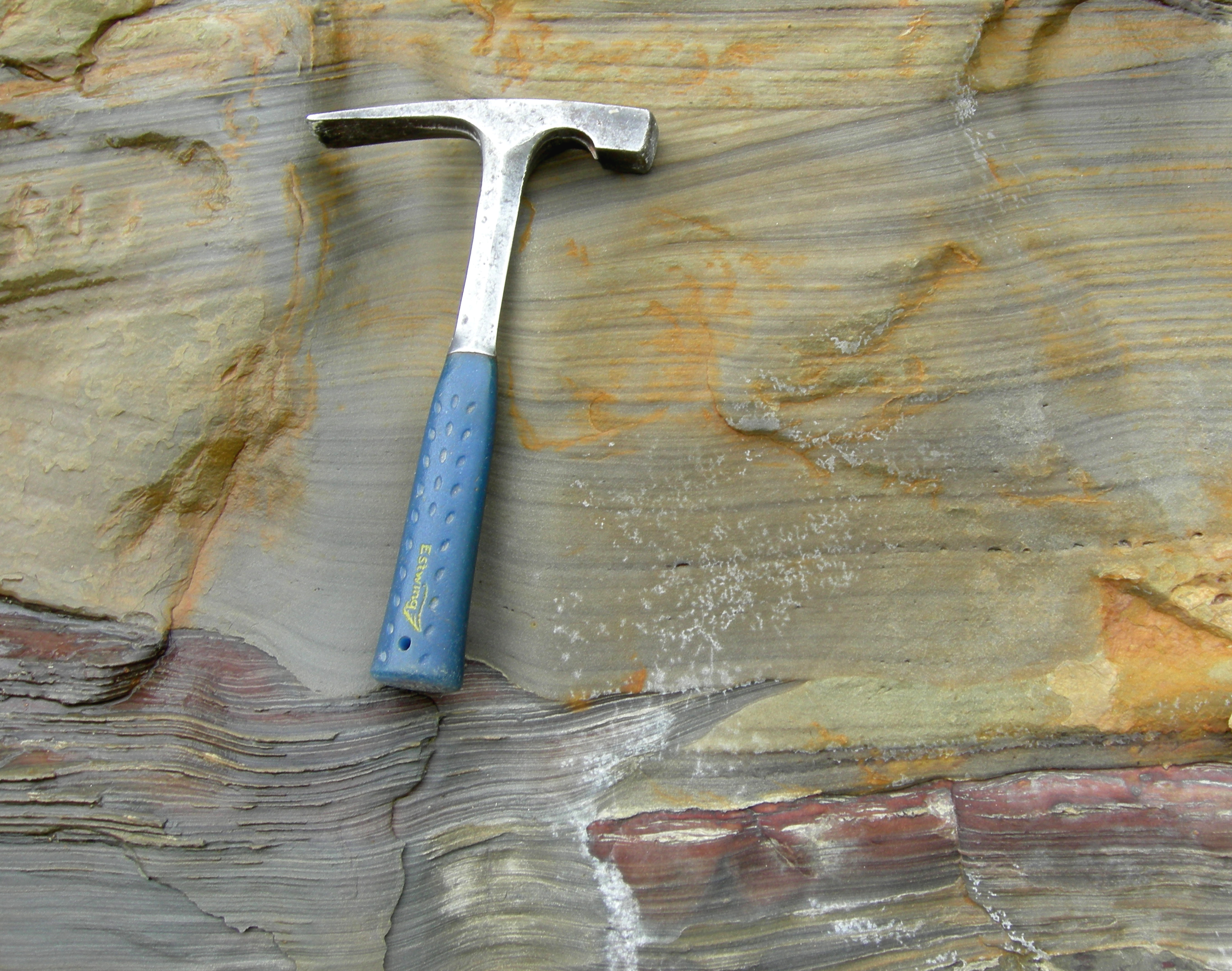
Cross-bedding and scour in sandstone of the Logan Formation (Lower Carboniferous) of Jackson County, Ohio

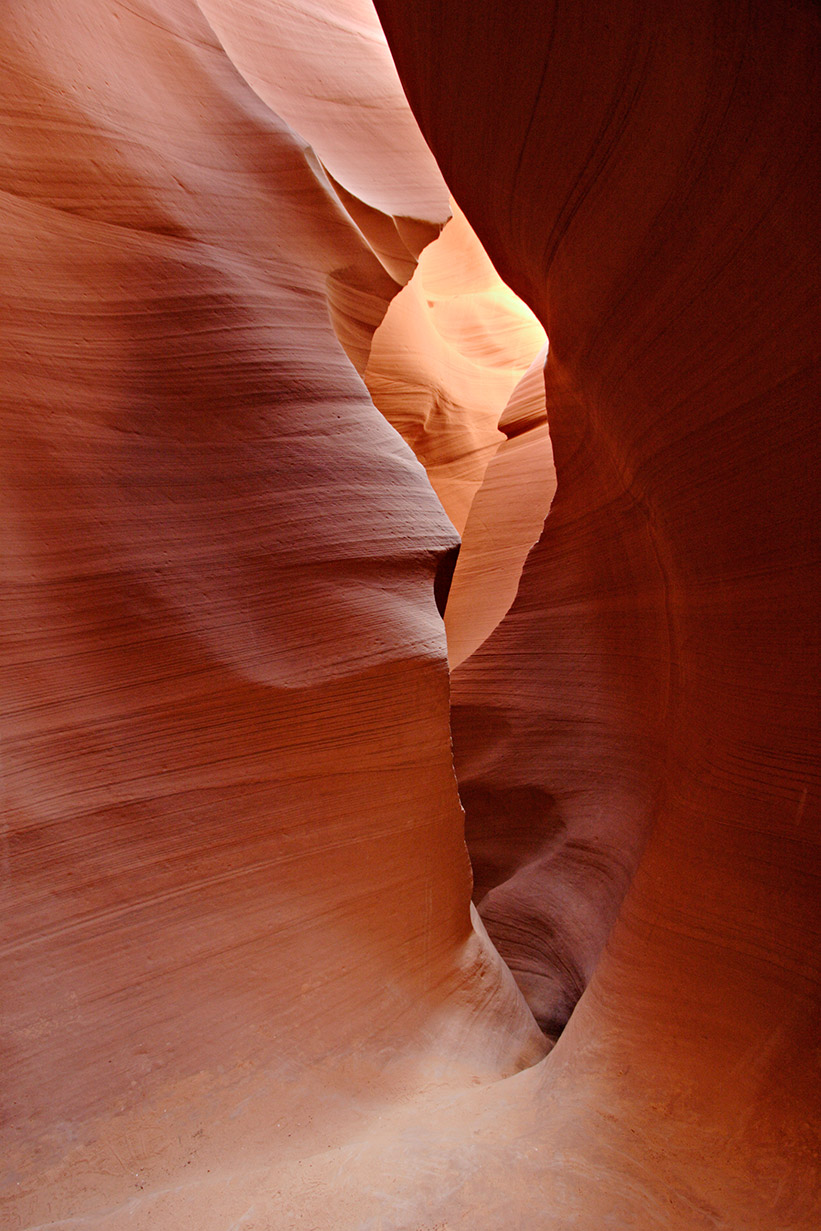
Red sandstone interior of Lower Antelope Canyon, Arizona, worn smooth by erosion from flash flooding over thousands of years

== Components ==
=== Framework grains ===
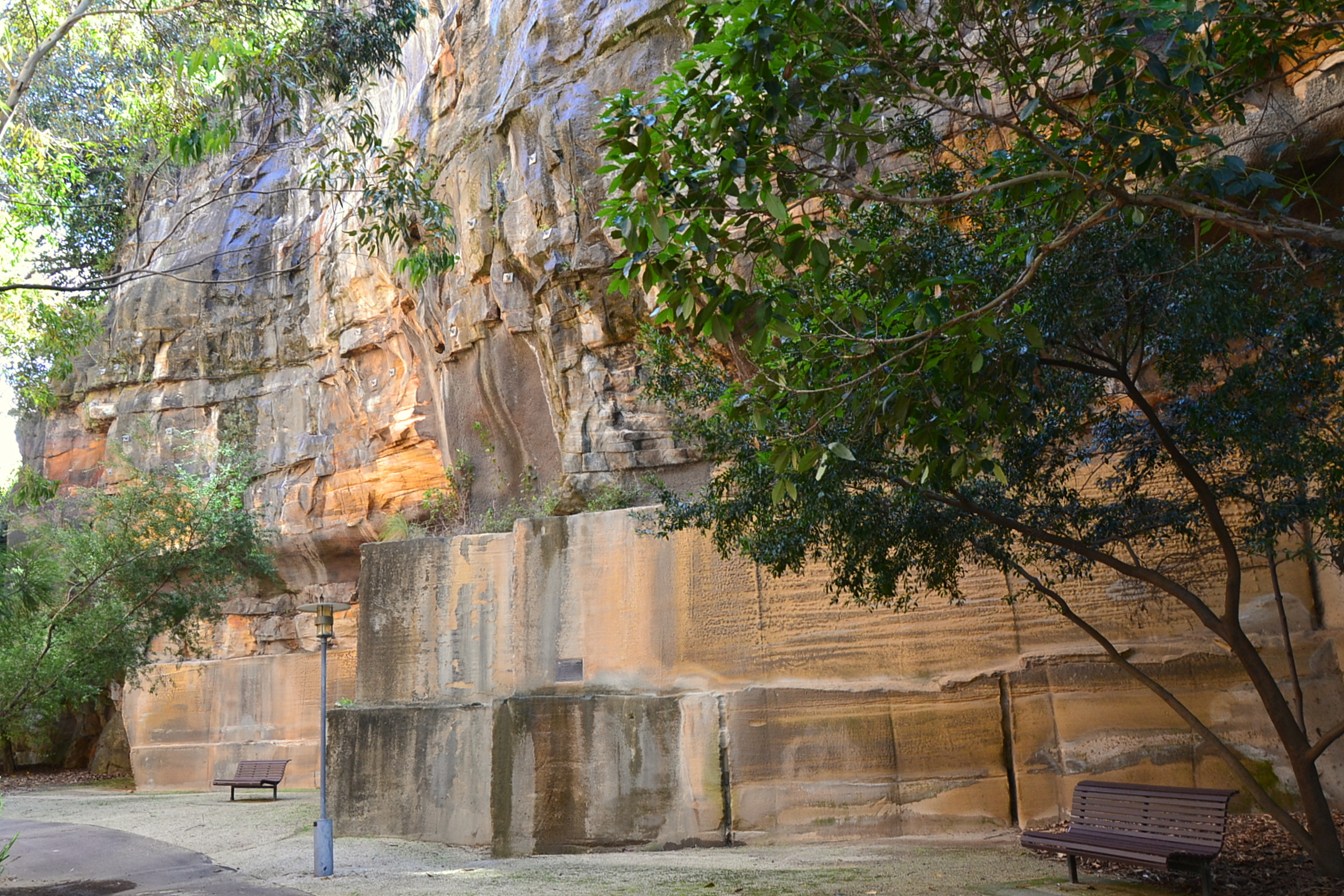
Paradise Quarry, Sydney, Australia

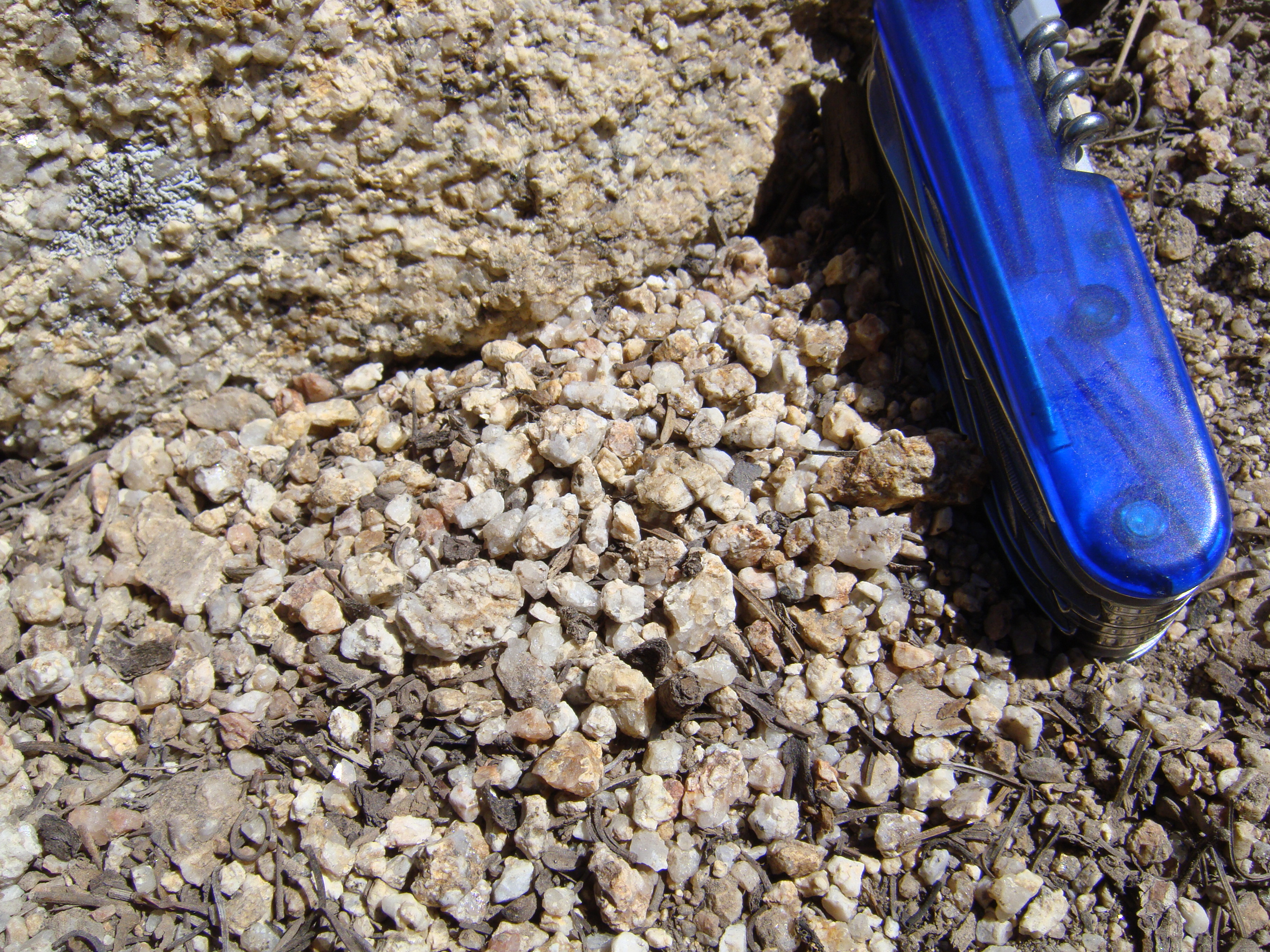
Grus sand and the granitoid from which it is derived

Framework grains are sand-sized (0.0625-to-2-millimeter (0.00246 to 0.07874 in) diameter) detrital fragments that make up the bulk of a sandstone. Most framework grains are composed of quartz or feldspar, which are the common minerals most resistant to weathering processes at the Earth's surface, as seen in the Goldich dissolution series. Framework grains can be classified into several different categories based on their mineral composition:

- Quartz framework grains are the dominant minerals in most clastic sedimentary rocks; this is because they have exceptional physical properties, such as hardness and chemical stability. These physical properties allow the quartz grains to survive multiple recycling events, while also allowing the grains to display some degree of rounding. Quartz grains evolve from plutonic rock, which are felsic in origin and also from older sandstones that have been recycled.
- Feldspathic framework grains are commonly the second most abundant mineral in sandstones. Feldspar can be divided into alkali feldspars and plagioclase feldspars, which can be distinguished under a petrographic microscope.

- Alkali feldspar range in chemical composition from KAlSi_{3}O_{8} to NaAlSi_{3}O_{8}.

- Plagioclase feldspar range in composition from NaAlSi_{3}O_{8} to CaAl_{2}Si_{2}O_{8}.

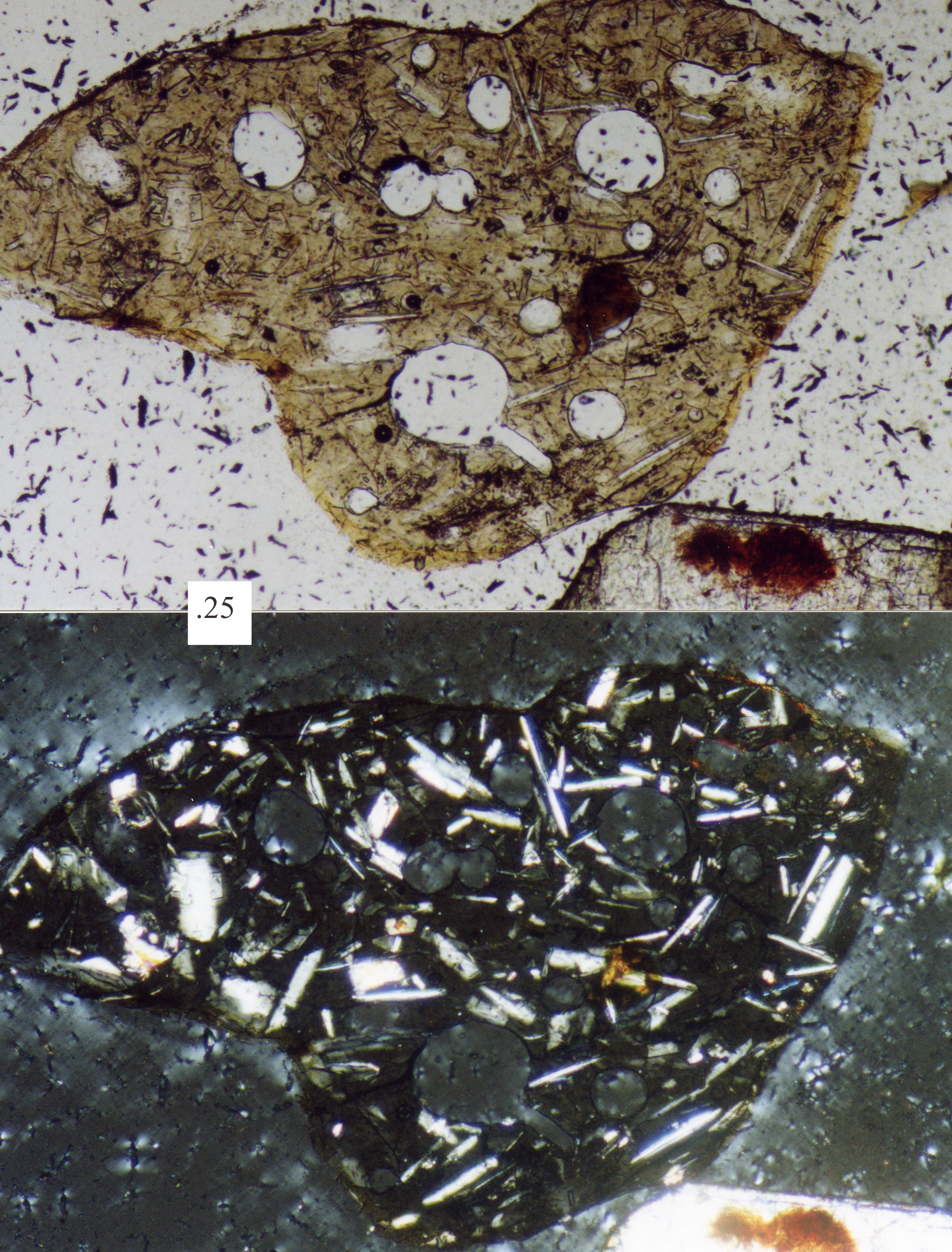
Photomicrograph of a volcanic sand grain; upper picture is plane-polarised light, bottom picture is cross-polarised light, scale box at left-centre is 0.25 millimeter. This type of grain would be a main component of a lithic sandstone.

- Lithic framework grains (also called lithic fragments or lithic clasts) are pieces of ancient source rock that have yet to weather away to individual mineral grains. Lithic fragments can be any fine-grained or coarse-grained igneous, metamorphic, or sedimentary rock, although the most common lithic fragments found in sedimentary rocks are clasts of volcanic rocks.
- Accessory minerals are all other mineral grains in a sandstone. These minerals usually make up just a small percentage of the grains in a sandstone. Common accessory minerals include micas (muscovite and biotite), olivine, pyroxene, and corundum. Many of these accessory grains are more dense than the silicates that make up the bulk of the rock. These heavy minerals are commonly resistant to weathering and can be used as an indicator of sandstone maturity through the ZTR index. Common heavy minerals include zircon, tourmaline, rutile (hence ZTR), garnet, magnetite, or other dense, resistant minerals derived from the source rock.

=== Matrix ===
Matrix is very fine material, which is present within interstitial pore space between the framework grains. The nature of the matrix within the interstitial pore space results in a twofold classification:

- Arenites are texturally clean sandstones that are free of or have very little matrix.
- Wackes are texturally dirty sandstones that have a significant amount of matrix.

=== Cement ===
Cement is what binds the siliciclastic framework grains together. Cement is a secondary mineral that forms after deposition and during burial of the sandstone. These cementing materials may be either silicate minerals or non-silicate minerals, such as calcite.

- Silica cement can consist of either quartz or opal minerals. Quartz is the most common silicate mineral that acts as cement. In sandstone where there is silica cement present, the quartz grains are attached to cement, which creates a rim around the quartz grain called overgrowth. The overgrowth retains the same crystallographic continuity of quartz framework grain that is being cemented. Opal cement is found in sandstones that are rich in volcanogenic materials, and very rarely is in other sandstones.
- Calcite cement is the most common carbonate cement. Calcite cement is an assortment of smaller calcite crystals. The cement adheres to the framework grains, cementing the framework grains together.
- Other minerals that act as cements include: hematite, limonite, feldspars, anhydrite, gypsum, barite, clay minerals, and zeolite minerals.

Sandstone that becomes depleted of its cement binder through weathering gradually becomes friable and unstable. This process can be somewhat reversed by the application of tetraethyl orthosilicate (Si(OC_{2}H_{5})_{4}) which will deposit amorphous silicon dioxide between the sand grains. The reaction is as follows.

Si(OC_{2}H_{5})_{4} (l) + 2 H_{2}O (l) → SiO_{2} (s) + 4 C_{2}H_{5}OH (g)

=== Pore space ===
Pore space includes the open spaces within a rock or a soil. The pore space in a rock has a direct relationship to the porosity and permeability of the rock. The porosity and permeability are directly influenced by the way the sand grains are packed together.

- Porosity is the percentage of bulk volume that is inhabited by interstices within a given rock. Porosity is directly influenced by the packing of even-sized spherical grains, rearranged from loosely packed to tightest packed in sandstones.
- Permeability is the rate in which water or other fluids flow through the rock. For groundwater, work permeability may be measured in gallons per day through a one square foot cross section under a unit hydraulic gradient.

== Types of sandstone ==
Sandstones are typically classified by point-counting a thin section using a method like the Gazzi-Dickinson Method. This yields the relative percentages of quartz, feldspar, and lithic grains and the amount of clay matrix. The composition of a sandstone can provide important information on the genesis of the sediments when used with a triangular quartz, feldspar, lithic chart (QFL diagrams). However, geologists have not been able to agree on a set of boundaries separating regions of the QFL triangle.

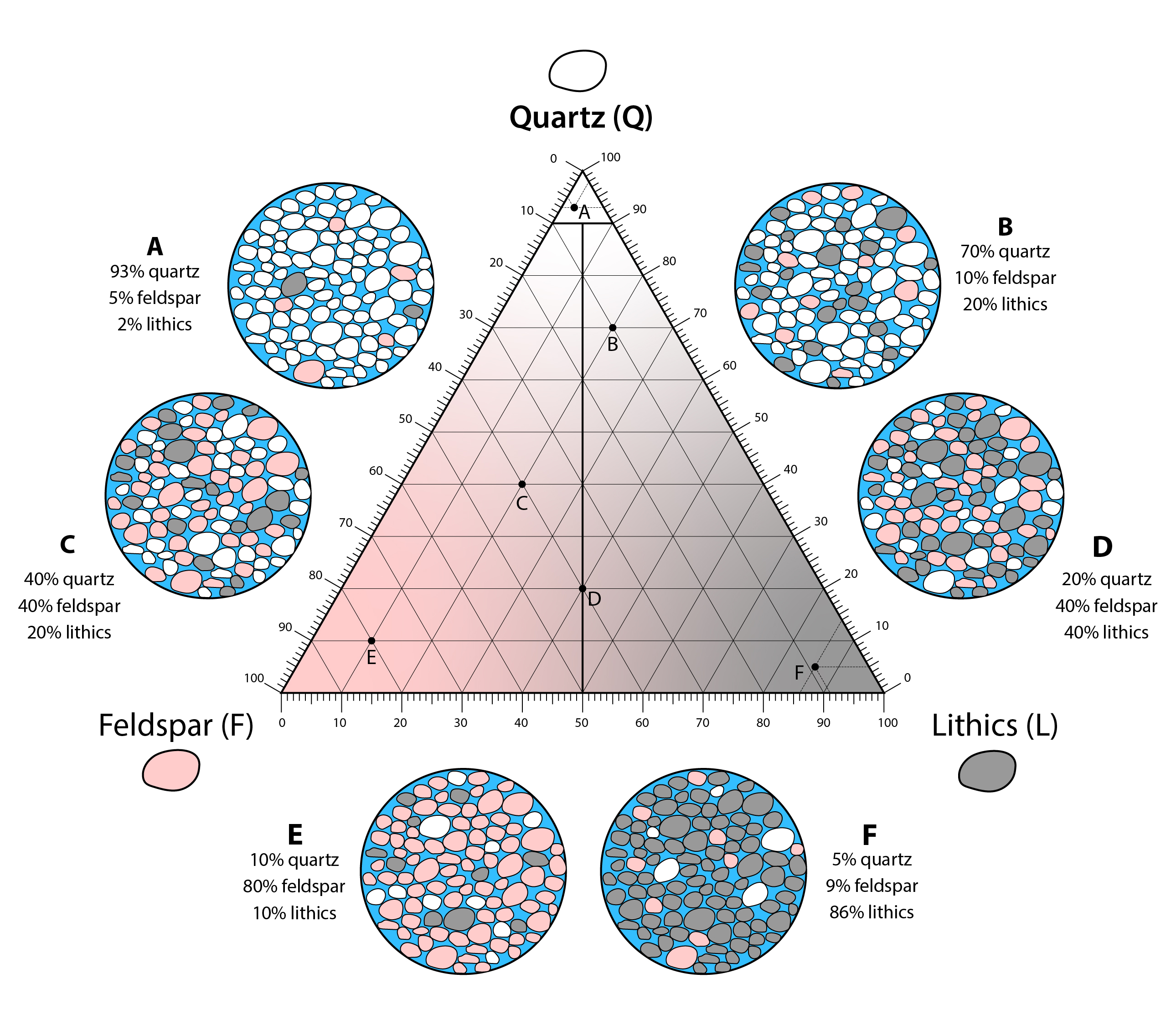
Ternary plot showing the relative abundance of quartz, feldspar, and lithic grains in a sandstone

Visual aids are diagrams that allow geologists to interpret different characteristics of a sandstone. For example, a QFL chart can be marked with a provenance model that shows the likely tectonic origin of sandstones with various compositions of framework grains. Likewise, the stage of textural maturity chart illustrates the different stages that a sandstone goes through as the degree of kinetic processing of the sediments increases.

Schematic QFL diagram showing tectonic provinces and sandstone provenance

- A QFL chart is a representation of the framework grains and matrix that is present in a sandstone. This chart is similar to those used in igneous petrology. When plotted correctly, this model of analysis creates a meaningful quantitative classification of sandstones.
- A sandstone provenance chart is typically based on a QFL chart but allows geologists to visually interpret the different types of places from which sandstones can originate.
- A stage of textural maturity chart shows the differences between immature, submature, mature, and supermature sandstones. As the sandstone becomes more mature, grains become more rounded, and there is less clay in the matrix of the rock.

=== Dott's classification scheme ===
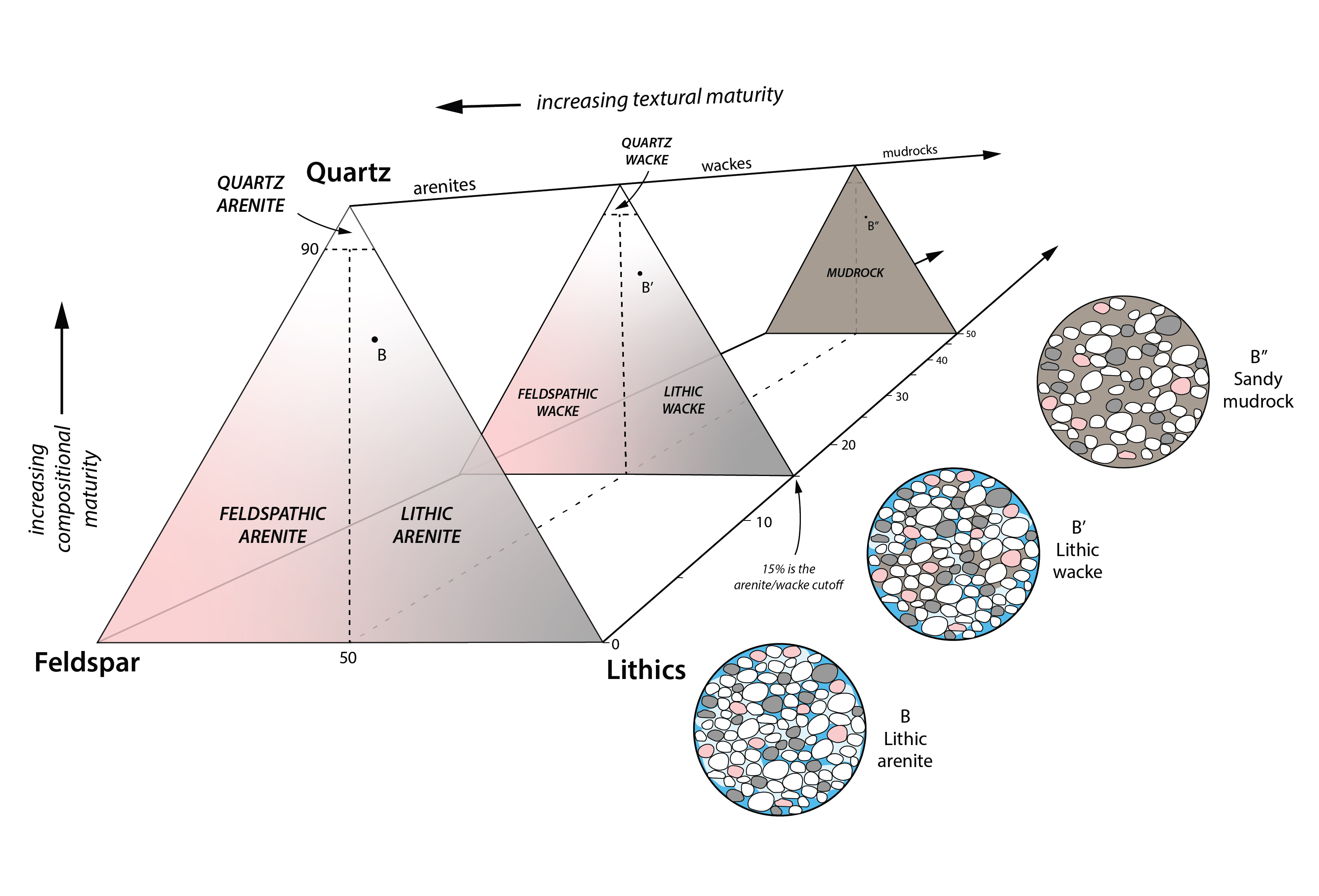
Diagram showing a slightly modified version of the Dott (1964) classification scheme

Dott's (1964) sandstone classification scheme is one of many such schemes used by geologists for classifying sandstones. Dott's scheme is a modification of Gilbert's classification of silicate sandstones, and it incorporates R.L. Folk's dual textural and compositional maturity concepts into one classification system. The philosophy behind combining Gilbert's and R. L. Folk's schemes is that it is better able to "portray the continuous nature of textural variation from mudstone to arenite and from stable to unstable grain composition". Dott's classification scheme is based on the mineralogy of framework grains, and on the type of matrix present in between the framework grains.

In this specific classification scheme, Dott has set the boundary between arenite and wackes at 15% matrix. In addition, Dott also breaks up the different types of framework grains that can be present in a sandstone into three major categories: quartz, feldspar, and lithic grains.

- Arenites are types of sandstone that have less than 15% clay matrix in between the framework grains.
  - Quartz arenites are sandstones that contain more than 90% of siliceous grains. Grains can include quartz or chert rock fragments. Quartz arenites are texturally mature to supermature sandstones. These pure quartz sands result from extensive weathering that occurred before and during transport. This weathering removed everything but quartz grains, the most stable mineral. They are commonly affiliated with rocks that are deposited in a stable cratonic environment, such as aeolian beaches or shelf environments. Quartz arenites emanate from multiple recycling of quartz grains, generally as sedimentary source rocks and less regularly as first-cycle deposits derived from primary igneous or metamorphic rocks.
  - Feldspathic arenites are sandstones that contain less than 90% quartz, and more feldspar than unstable lithic fragments, and minor accessory minerals. Feldspathic sandstones are commonly immature or sub-mature. These sandstones occur in association with cratonic or stable shelf settings. Feldspathic sandstones are derived from granitic-type, primary crystalline, rocks. If the sandstone is dominantly plagioclase, then it is igneous in origin.
  - Lithic arenites are characterised by generally high content of unstable lithic fragments. Examples include volcanic and metamorphic clasts, though stable clasts such as chert are common in lithic arenites. This type of rock contains less than 90% quartz grains and more unstable rock fragments than feldspars. They are commonly immature to submature texturally. They are associated with fluvial conglomerates and other fluvial deposits, or in deeper water marine conglomerates. They are formed under conditions that produce large volumes of unstable material, derived from fine-grained rocks, mostly shales, volcanic rocks, and metamorphic rock.
- Wackes are sandstones that contain more than 15% clay matrix between framework grains.
  - Quartz wackes are uncommon because quartz arenites are texturally mature to supermature.
  - Felspathic wackes are feldspathic sandstone that contain a matrix that is greater than 15%.
  - Lithic wacke is a sandstone in which the matrix greater than 15%.
- Arkose sandstones are more than 25 percent feldspar. The grains tend to be poorly rounded and less well sorted than those of pure quartz sandstones. These feldspar-rich sandstones come from rapidly eroding granitic and metamorphic terrains where chemical weathering is subordinate to physical weathering.
- Greywacke sandstones are a heterogeneous mixture of lithic fragments and angular grains of quartz and feldspar or grains surrounded by a fine-grained clay matrix. Much of this matrix is formed by relatively soft fragments, such as shale and some volcanic rocks, that are chemically altered and physically compacted after deep burial of the sandstone formation.

=== Quartzite ===
When sandstone is subjected to the great heat and pressure associated with regional metamorphism, the individual quartz grains recrystallize, along with the former cementing material, to form the metamorphic rock called quartzite. Most or all of the original texture and sedimentary structures of the sandstone are erased by the metamorphism. The grains are so tightly interlocked that when the rock is broken, it fractures through the grains to form an irregular or conchoidal fracture.

Geologists had recognized by 1941 that some rocks show the macroscopic characteristics of quartzite, even though they have not undergone metamorphism at high pressure and temperature. These rocks have been subject only to the much lower temperatures and pressures associated with diagenesis of sedimentary rock, but diagenesis has cemented the rock so thoroughly that microscopic examination is necessary to distinguish it from metamorphic quartzite. The term orthoquartzite is used to distinguish such sedimentary rock from metaquartzite produced by metamorphism. By extension, the term orthoquartzite has occasionally been more generally applied to any quartz-cemented quartz arenite. Orthoquartzite (in the narrow sense) is often 99% SiO_{2} with only very minor amounts of iron oxide and trace resistant minerals such as zircon, rutile and magnetite. Although few fossils are normally present, the original texture and sedimentary structures are preserved.

The typical distinction between a true orthoquartzite and an ordinary quartz sandstone is that an orthoquartzite is so highly cemented that it will fracture across grains, not around them. This is a distinction that can be recognized in the field. In turn, the distinction between an orthoquartzite and a metaquartzite is the onset of recrystallization of existing grains. The dividing line may be placed at the point where strained quartz grains begin to be replaced by new, unstrained, small quartz grains, producing a mortar texture that can be identified in thin sections under a polarizing microscope. With increasing grade of metamorphism, further recrystallization produces foam texture, characterized by polygonal grains meeting at triple junctions, and then porphyroblastic texture, characterized by coarse, irregular grains, including some larger grains (porphyroblasts.)

== Uses ==
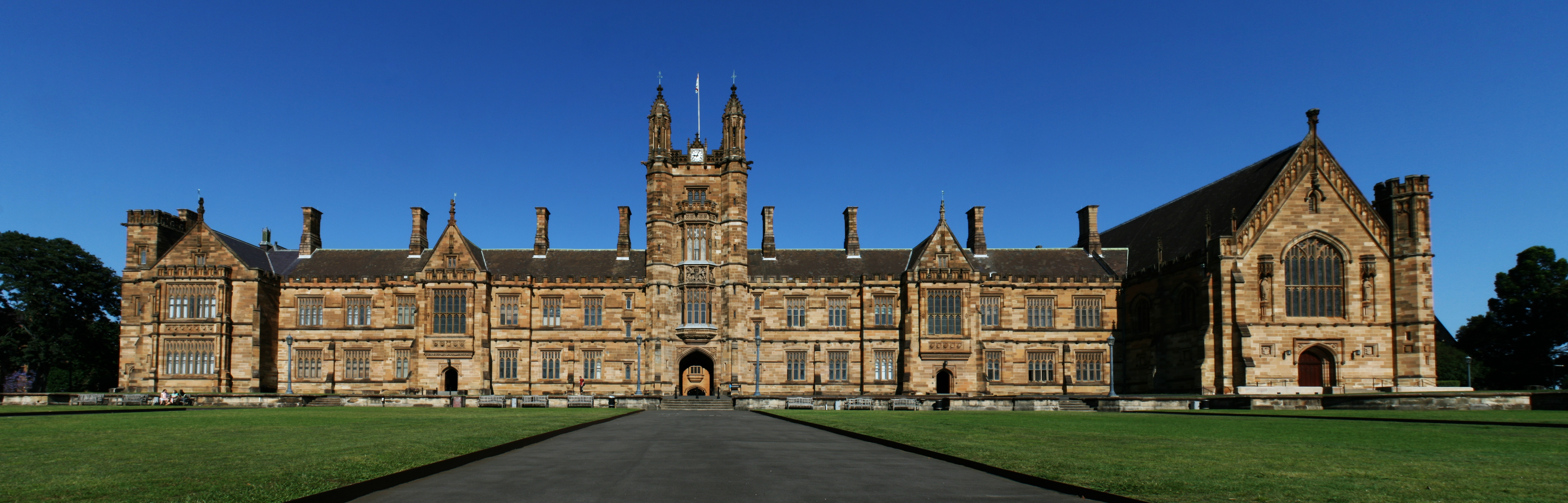
The Main Quadrangle of the University of Sydney, a so-called sandstone university

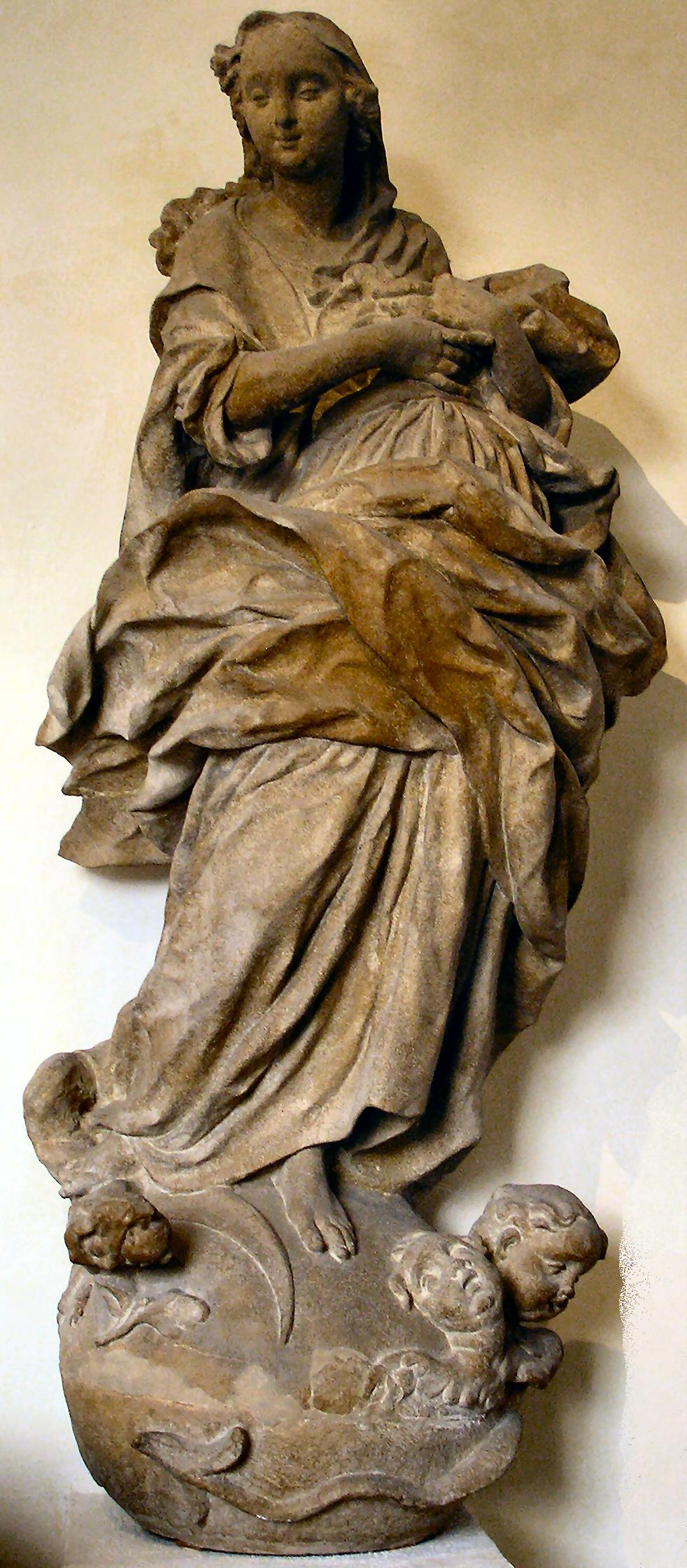
Sandstone statue Maria Immaculata by Fidelis Sporer, around 1770, in Freiburg, Germany

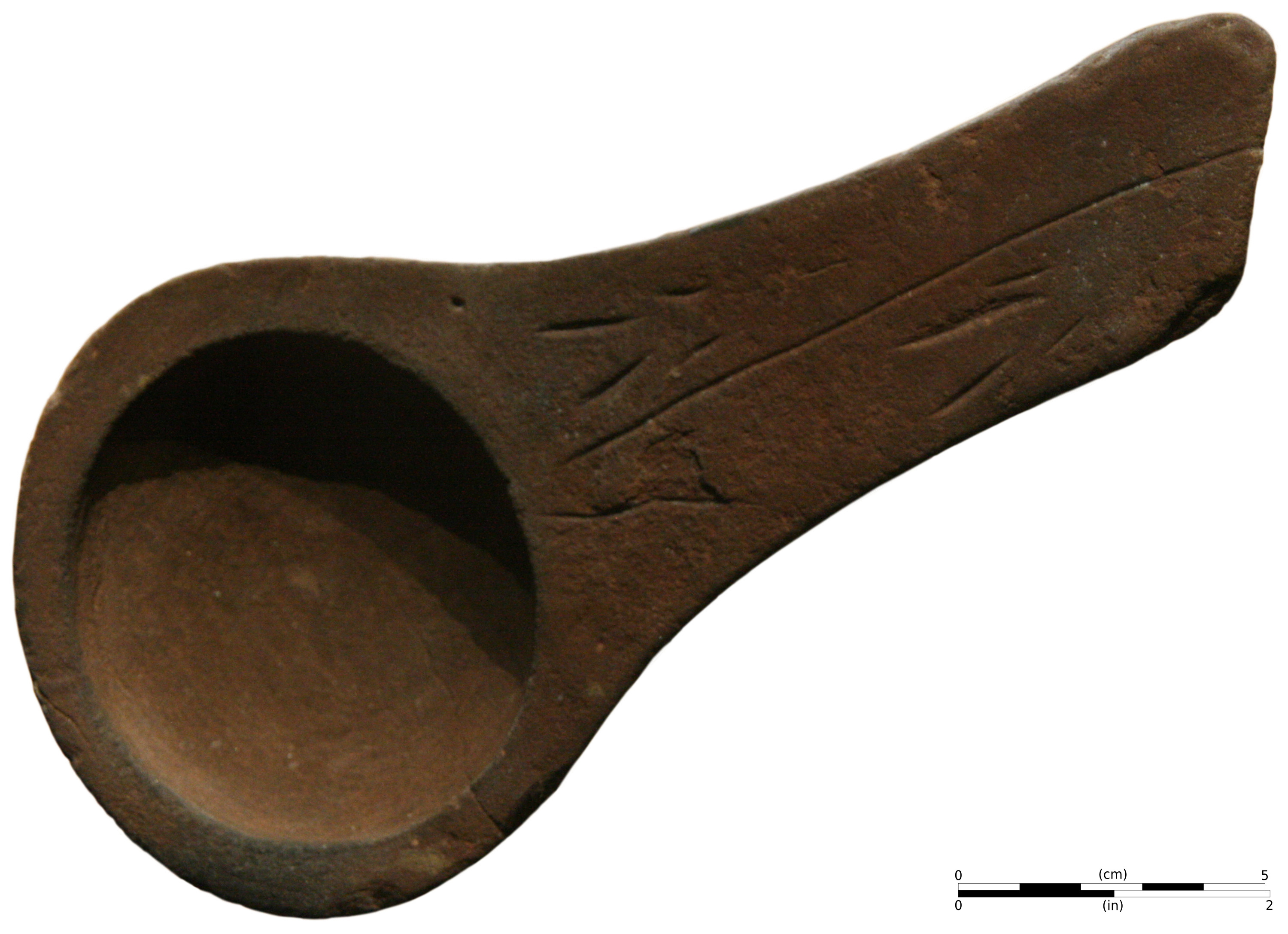
17,000 yr old sandstone oil lamp discovered at the caves of Lascaux, France

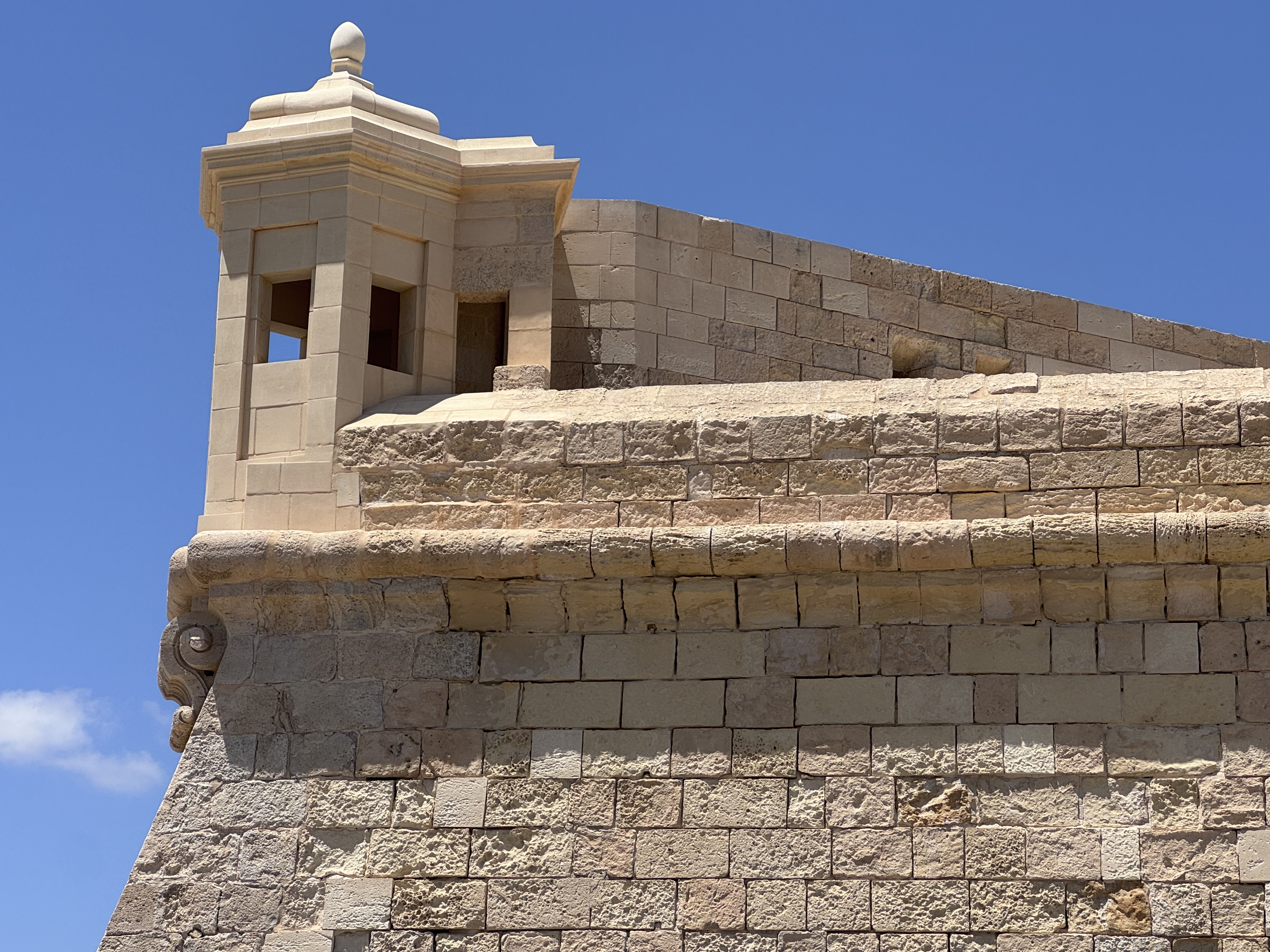
A watchtower of Fort Saint Elmo, Malta showing several stages of sandstone weathering and restoration

Sandstone has been used since prehistoric times for construction, decorative art works and tools. It has been widely employed around the world in constructing temples, churches, homes and other buildings, and in civil engineering.

Although its resistance to weathering varies, sandstone is easy to work. That makes it a common building and paving material, including in asphalt concrete. However, some types that have been used in the past, such as the Collyhurst sandstone used in North West England, have had poor long-term weather resistance, necessitating repair and replacement in older buildings. Because of the hardness of individual grains, uniformity of grain size and friability of their structure, some types of sandstone are excellent materials from which to make grindstones, for sharpening blades and other implements. Non-friable sandstone can be used to make grindstones for grinding grain, e.g., gritstone.

A type of pure quartz sandstone, orthoquartzite, with more of 90–95 percent of quartz, has been proposed for nomination to the Global Heritage Stone Resource. In some regions of Argentina, the orthoquartzite-stoned façade is one of the main features of the Mar del Plata style bungalows.

== See also ==
- Dimension stone – Natural stone that has been finished to specific sizes and shapes
- List of sandstones
- Kurkar – Regional name for an aeolian quartz calcrete on the Levantine coast
- Sedimentary basin – Regions of long-term subsidence creating space for infilling by sediments
- Sydney sandstone – Medium to coarse-grained quartz sandstone with minor shale and laminite lenses
- Yorkstone – Variety of sandstone from Yorkshire, England
- Marble of Thorigny

== Bibliography ==
- Folk, R.L., 1965, Petrology of sedimentary rocks PDF version. Austin: Hemphill's Bookstore. 2nd ed. 1981, ISBN 0-914696-14-9.
- Pettijohn F. J., P.E. Potter and R. Siever, 1987, Sand and sandstone, 2nd ed. Springer-Verlag. ISBN 0-387-96350-2.
- Scholle, P.A., 1978, A Color illustrated guide to constituents, textures, cements, and porosities of sandstones and associated rocks, American Association of Petroleum Geologists Memoir no. 28. ISBN 0-89181-304-7.
- Scholle, P.A., and D. Spearing, 1982, Sandstone depositional environments: clastic terrigenous sediments , American Association of Petroleum Geologists Memoir no. 31. ISBN 0-89181-307-1.
- USGS Minerals Yearbook: Stone, Dimension Archived 10 August 2007 at the Wayback Machine, Thomas P. Dolley, U.S. Dept. of the Interior, 2005 (format: PDF).
