= Goldich dissolution series =

Mineral weathering prediction method

The Goldich dissolution series is a method of predicting the relative stability or weathering rate of common igneous minerals on the Earth's surface, with minerals that form at higher temperatures and pressures less stable on the surface than minerals that form at lower temperatures and pressures.

Discontinuous; Series	Continuous; Series
Olivine	Plagioclase (Calcium rich)
Pyroxene
Amphibole
Biotite (Black Mica)	Plagioclase (Sodium rich)
Orthoclase
Muscovite (White Mica)
Quartz

High
Relative; Weathering potential
Low

== Chemical weathering processes ==
S. S. Goldich derived this series in 1938 after studying soil profiles and their parent rocks. Based on sample analysis from a series of weathered localities, Goldich determined that the weathering rate of minerals is controlled at least in part by the order in which they crystallize from a melt. This order meant that the minerals that crystallized first from the melt were the least stable under earth surface conditions, while the minerals that crystallized last were the most stable. This is not the only control on weathering rate; this rate is dependent on both intrinsic (qualities specific to the minerals) and extrinsic (qualities specific to the environment) variables. Climate is a key extrinsic variable, controlling the water to rock ratio, pH, and alkalinity, all of which impact the rate of weathering. The Goldich dissolution series concerns intrinsic mineral qualities, which were proven both by Goldich as well as preceding scientists to also be important for constraining weathering rates.

Earlier work by Steidtmann demonstrated that the order of ionic loss of a rock as it weathers is: CO_{3}^{2-}, Mg^{2+}, Na^{+}, K^{+}, SiO_{2}^{−}, Fe^{2+/3+}, and finally Al^{3+}. Goldich furthered this analysis by noting the relative mineral stability order, which is related to the relative resistance of these ions to leaching. Goldich notes that overall, mafic (rich in iron and magnesium) minerals are less stable than felsic (rich in silica) minerals. The order of stability in the series echoes Bowen's reaction series very well, leading Goldich to suggest that the relative stability at the surface is controlled by crystallization order.

While Goldich's original order of mineral weathering potential was qualitative, later work by Michal Kowalski and J. Donald Rimstidt placed in the series in quantitative terms. Kowalski and Rimstidt performed an analysis of mechanical and chemical grain weathering, and demonstrated that the average lifetime of chemically weathered detrital grains quantitatively fit the Goldich sequence extremely well. This helped to supplement the real-world applicability of the dissolution series. The difference in chemical weathering time can span millions of years. For example, quickest to weather of the common igneous minerals is apatite, which reaches complete weathering in an average of 10^{5.48} years, and slowest to weather is quartz, which weathers fully in 10^{8.59} years.

== Bowen's reaction series ==
The Goldich dissolution series follows the same pattern of the Bowen's reaction series, with the minerals that are first to crystallize also the first the undergo chemical weathering. The Bowen's reaction series dictates that during fractional crystallization, olivine and Ca-plagioclase feldspars are the first to crystallize out of a melt, after which follows pyroxene, amphibole, biotite, Na-plagioglase, orthoclase feldspar, muscovite, and finally, quartz. This order is controlled by the temperature of the melt and its composition. Because earlier crystallizing minerals are more stable at higher temperatures and pressures, these weather the fastest under surface conditions.

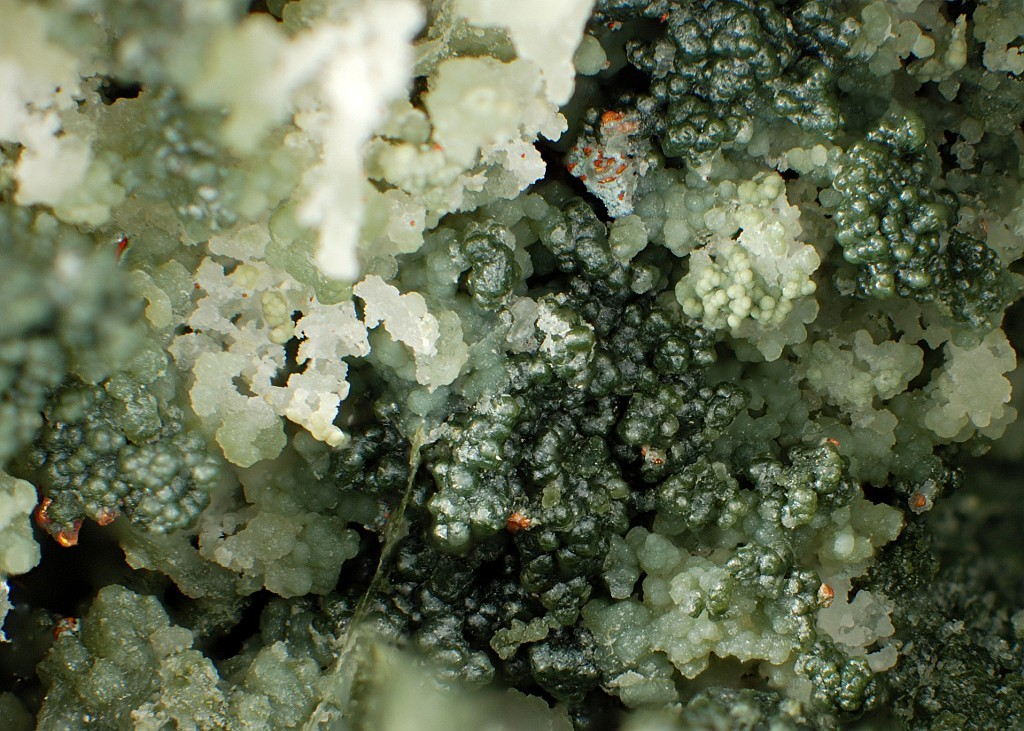
Saponite is a common weathering product of ultramafic and mafic rocks. It is found in high-pH evaporite lakes and in association with basalts or serpentines.

== Common secondary minerals ==
Chemical weathering of igneous minerals leads to the formation of secondary minerals, which constitute the weathering products of the parent minerals. Secondary weathering minerals of igneous rocks can be classified mainly as iron oxides, salts, and phyllosilicates. The chemistry of the secondary minerals is controlled in part by the chemistry of the parent rock. Mafic rocks tends to contain higher proportions of magnesium and ferric and ferrous iron, which can lead to secondary minerals high in abundance of these cations, including serpentine, Al-, Mg- and Ca-rich clays, and iron oxides such as hematite. Felsic rocks tends to have relatively higher proportions of potassium and sodium, which can lead to secondary minerals rich in these ions, including Al-, Na- and K-rich clays such as kaolinite, montmorillonite and illite.

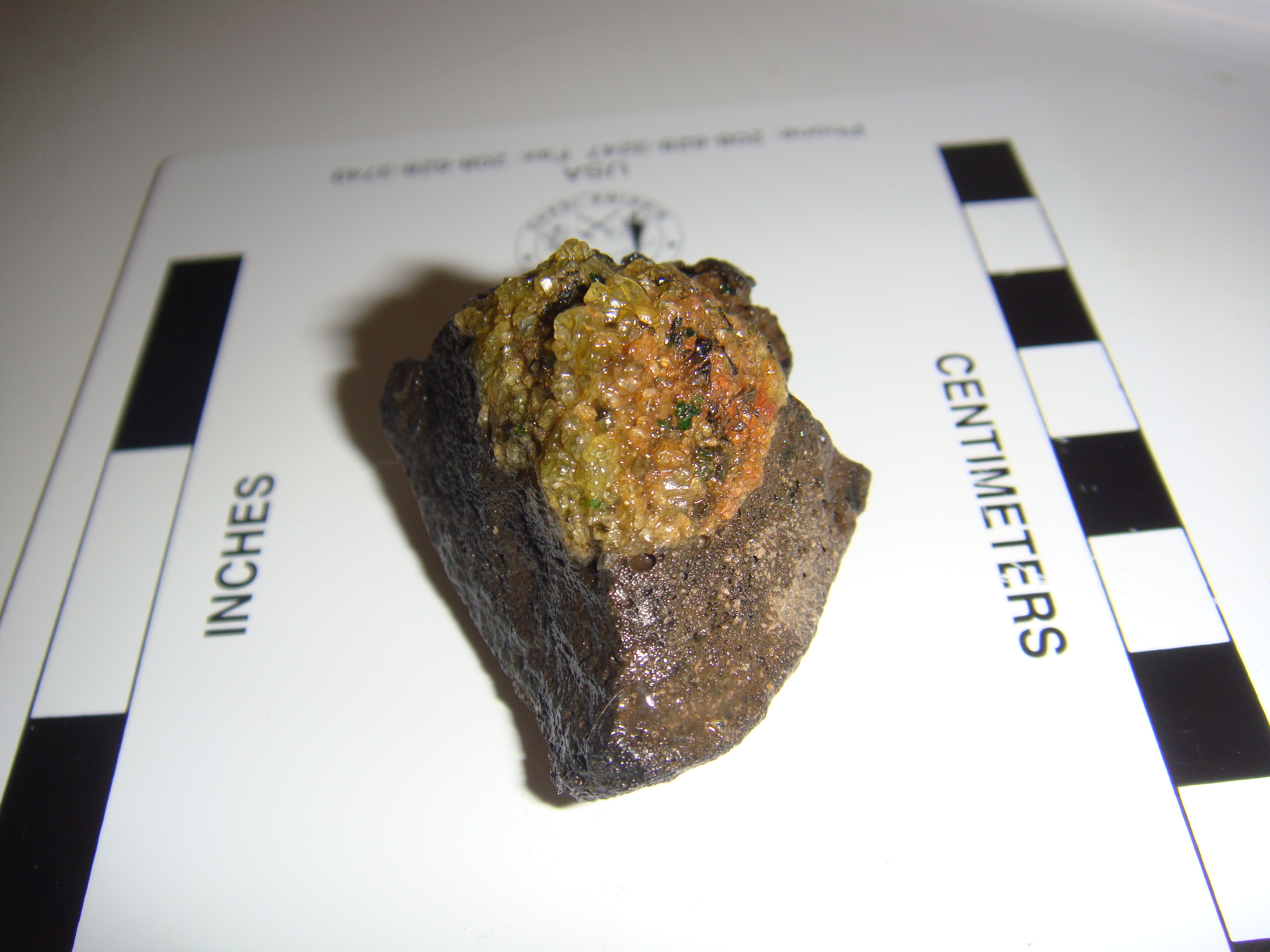
Olivine weathering to iddingsite within a mantle xenolith, a common reaction within the series

== Application to soil profiles ==
The Goldich dissolution series can be applied to Lithosequences, which are a way of characterizing a soil profile based on its parent material. Lithosequences include soils that have undergone relatively similar weathering conditions, so variations in composition are based on the relative weathering rates of parent minerals. Therefore, the weathering rates of these soils and their compositions are primarily influenced by the relative proportion of minerals in the Goldich dissolution series.

== Limitations ==
Experimental work by White and Brantley (2003) highlighted some of the limitations of the Goldich dissolution series, most notably that some variations in weathering rates of different minerals are not as pronounced as Goldich argues. According to the Goldich dissolution series, anorthite, a plagioclase feldspar, should weather quickly, with a lifetime of 10^{5.62} years quantified by Kowalski and Rimstidt. Conversely, the lifetime of K-feldspar should be much longer, at 10^{8.53} years based again on Kowalski and Rimstidt's work. However, White and Brantley's experimental results demonstrate that the relative weathering rates of K-feldspar and plagioclase feldspar are quite similar, and mainly moderated by the extent to which the minerals had already been weathered (in an exponentially decreasing function). This demonstrates that the Goldich series may not apply across all kinds of weathering processes, and likewise does not take into account the effect of exponential decay in weathering rate of a surface.
