= Heavy mineral =

In geology, a heavy mineral is a mineral with a density that is greater than 2.9 g/cm^{3}, most commonly referring to dense components of siliciclastic sediments. A heavy mineral suite is the relative percentages of heavy minerals in a stone. Heavy mineral suites are used to help determine the provenance and history of sedimentary rocks.

As heavy minerals are a minor constituent of most sedimentary rock, they must be separated out to be studied. Heavy mineral separation generally uses a dense liquid in either a separatory funnel or centrifuge. Liquids used include bromoform, tetrabromoethane, tribromoethane, methylene iodide, and polytungstate liquids.
