= Tectonic burial =

Geologic process

Tectonic Burial is the deformation of rocks caused by extreme pressure over millions of years. It often causes temperature evolutions and deep burials. Tectonic burial is usually the result of continental collisions or subduction in a region. An increase in burial depth leads to a weakened basin and basement but creates better preservation structure within the basement.

== Geologic processes ==
=== Sedimentary burial ===
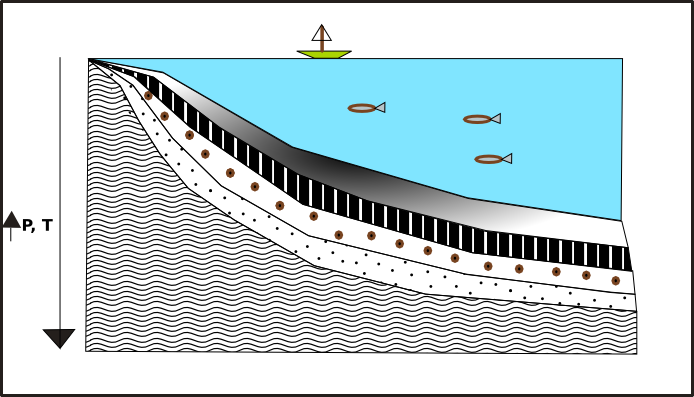
Sedimentary burial diagram

Sedimentary burial is more typical when thinking of burial processes. Sedimentary burial is the deposition of sediments on and area of interest such as a sedimentary basin, oceans, or other locations typically leading to Diagenesis.

=== Tectonic burial ===
Tectonic Burial specifically refers to burial of material on a area of interest as a result of tectonic processes such as a Thrust fault or other processes of crustal thickening. Tectonic burial is common in orogenic systems such as mountain belts or collisional zones. This is a critical part of the rock cycle and can lead to burial metamorphism and heating.

== Evidence for tectonic burial ==
=== Radiometric dating ===
One way of identifying a tectonic burial event is through radiometric dating. Burial events may be radiometric dated by looking at the cooling of the event and its impact on the minerals within the formation.

=== Metamorphism ===
When rocks or sediments get buried they begin to increase in temperature and pressure as the mass above accumulates. Metamorphism occurs at temperatures greater than 200 °C and pressures greater than 300 MPa. Burial metamorphism overlaps with diagenesis with an increase in pressure and temperature. Sedimentary rocks buried at depths of a couple kilo meters will begin generating temperatures above 300 °C without differential stress.

=== Thermochronology ===
Tectonic burial events can be distinguished by Thermochronology. During a tectonic burial event rocks increase in heat until they reach their Closure temperature . These closure temperatures are an indication of burial depth history and are used by thermochronogists in dating a tectonic burial event.

=== Vitrinite reflectance ===
Sediment deposition over a basin with organic material can create a primary component of coal, Vitrinite. High temperatures and pressures associated with Tectonic burial could produce vitrinite from woody organic material thus the presence of vitrinite may be a good indicator for a tectonic burial event.

== Effects ==
=== Coalification ===
It has been debated that burial depth may play a role into the advancement of coalification. Early in the 19th century it was thought to be caused purely by the pressure caused by burial, in some coal fields high ranking coal was found that made some geologists think that burial pressure increased the coalification rate.

=== Oil ===
Oil can be another product of tectonic burial. Oil is created in this fashion over a series of steps starting with the deposition of carbonate sediments followed by cracking and multiple stages of filling of oil like inclusions.

=== Pressure-temperature-time paths ===
One of the largest effects that tectonic burial has is a change in the pressure-temperature time paths, this can be identified by looking for metamorphism or by using thermochronology.

Burial of greater depths have the ability to reset fission track dates.

== Examples ==
=== Tectonic burial in southern Apennines ===
In the southern Apennines fold and thrust belts, indicators record timing of exhumation of sedimentary units.

=== Tectonic burial in the Persian Gulf ===
Evidence for the timing of diagenesis and oil migration.

=== Tectonic burial and coal production ===
Tectonic burial and its relationship to the advancement of coalification.
