= Pressure solution =

Rock deformation mechanism involving minerals dissolution under mechanical stress

Schematic diagram of pressure solution accommodating compression/compaction in a clastic rock. Left box shows the situation before compaction. Red arrows indicate areas of maximum stress (= grain contacts). Blue arrows indicate the flow of dissolved species (e.g., Ca^{2+} and HCO^{–}_{3} in case of limestone) in aqueous solution. Right box shows the situation after compaction. In light coloured areas new mineral growth has reduced pore space.

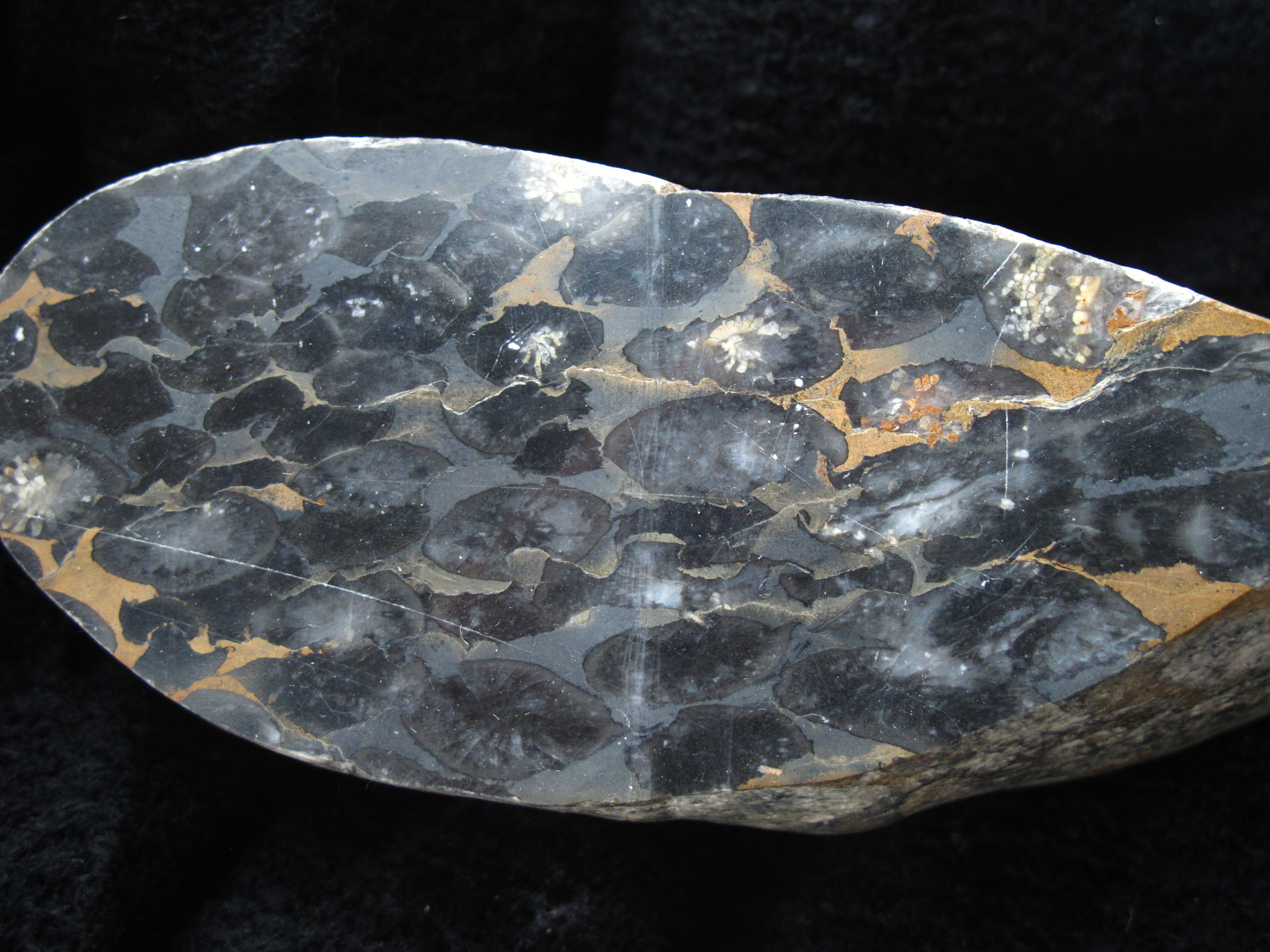
Deformed coral limestone showing flattening accommodated both by plastic deformation of the corals and pressure solution along stylolites.

In structural geology and diagenesis, pressure solution or pressure dissolution is a deformation mechanism that involves the dissolution of minerals at grain-to-grain contacts into an aqueous pore fluid in areas of relatively high stress and either deposition in regions of relatively low stress within the same rock or their complete removal from the rock within the fluid. It is an example of diffusive mass transfer.

The detailed kinetics of the process was reviewed by Rutter (1976), and since then such kinetics has been used in many applications in earth sciences.

== Occurrence ==
Evidence for pressure solution has been described from sedimentary rocks that have only been affected by compaction. The most common example of this is bedding plane parallel stylolites developed in carbonates.

In a tectonic manner, deformed rocks also show evidence of pressure solution including stylolites at a high angle to bedding. The process is also thought to be an important part of the development of cleavage.

== Theoretical models ==
A theoretical model was formulated by Rutter, and a recent mathematical analysis was carried out, leading to the so-called Fowler–Yang equations, which can explain the transition behaviour of pressure solution.

== See also ==
- Fick's laws of diffusion
- Fold (geology)
- Rock microstructure
- Stylolite
- Terzaghi's principle
