= Compaction (geology) =

Decrease of the porosity of a sediment under the lithostatic pressure exerted by loading

In sedimentology, compaction is the process by which a sediment progressively loses its porosity due to the effects of pressure from loading. This forms part of the process of lithification. When a layer of sediment is originally deposited, it contains an open framework of particles with the pore space being usually filled with water. As more sediment is deposited above the layer, the effect of the increased loading is to increase the particle-to-particle stresses resulting in porosity reduction primarily through a more efficient packing of the particles and to a lesser extent through elastic compression and pressure solution. The initial porosity of a sediment depends on its lithology. Mudstones start with porosities of >60%, sandstones typically ~40% and carbonates sometimes as high as 70%. Results from hydrocarbon exploration wells show clear porosity reduction trends with depth. Compaction trend estimation and decompaction process are useful for analyzing numerical basin evolution (e.g., subsidence) and evaluating hydrocarbon reservoirs and geological storages.

In sediments compacted under self-weight, especially in sedimentary basins, the porosity profiles often show an exponential decrease, called Athy's law as first shown by Athy in 1930. A mathematical analytical solution was obtained by Fowler and Yang to show the theoretical basis for Athy's law. This process can be easily observed in experiments and used as a good approximation to many real data.

== Differential compaction ==
If there is a variation in thickness and compactability of a sequence, loading by later deposits will give rise to spatially varying amounts of compaction. This form of compaction is a function of the lithology of the base sediment. Both the thickness and structure of the later sequence will be controlled by the underlying geology in the absence of any active tectonics. Buried tilted fault blocks in a rift basin often produce large anticlinal closures in the post-rift section that may form traps for hydrocarbons e.g. the Daqing Field, the largest oil field in the People's Republic of China, in the Songliao Basin.
