= Sediment gravity flow =

Sediment transport mechanism

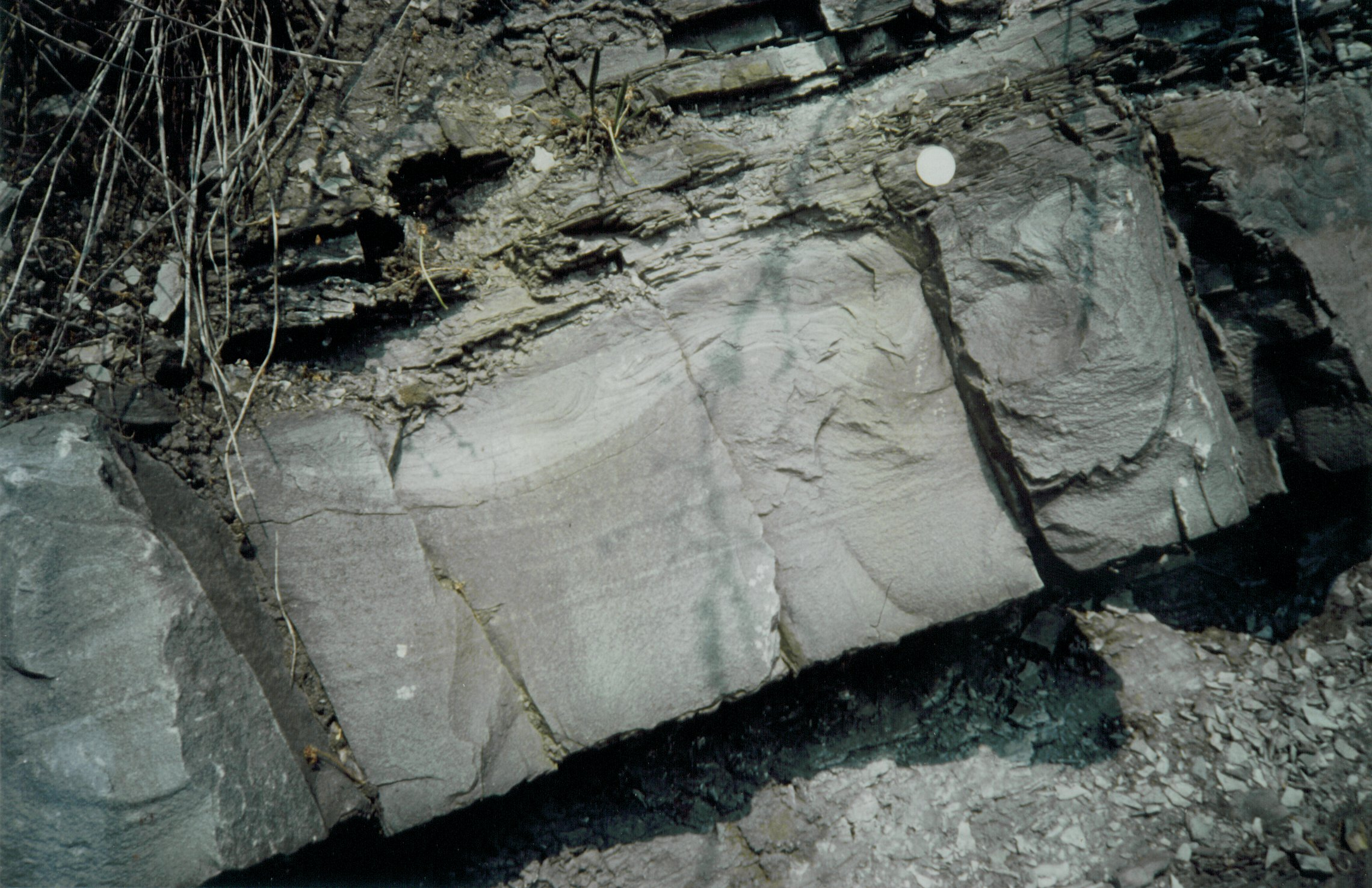
This turbidite from the Devonian Becke-Oese Sandstone of Germany is an example of a deposit from a sediment gravity flow. Note the complete Bouma sequence.

A sediment gravity flow is one of several types of sediment transport mechanisms, of which most geologists recognize four principal processes. These flows are differentiated by their dominant sediment support mechanisms, which can be difficult to distinguish as flows can be in transition from one type to the next as they evolve downslope.

== Sediment support mechanisms ==
Sediment gravity flows are represented by four different mechanisms of keeping grains within the flow in suspension.

- Grain flow – Grains in the flow are kept in suspension by grain-to-grain interactions, with the fluid acting only as a lubricant. As such, the grain-to-grain collisions generate a dispersive pressure that helps prevent grains from settling out of suspension. Although common in terrestrial environments on the slip faces of sand dunes, pure grain flows are rare in subaqueous settings. However, grain-to-grain interactions in high-density turbidity currents are very important as a contributing mechanism of sediment support.
- Liquefied flow (or fluidized flow) – Form in cohesionless granular substances. As grains at the base of a suspension settle out, fluid that is displaced upward by the settling generates pore fluid pressures that may help suspend grains in the upper part of the flow. Application of an external pressure to the suspension will initiate flow. This external pressure can be applied by a seismic shock, which may transform loose sand into a highly viscous suspension as in quicksand. Generally as soon as the flow begins to move, fluid turbulence results and the flow rapidly evolves into a turbidity current. Flows and suspensions are said to be liquefied when the grains settle downward through the fluid and displace the fluid upwards. By contrast, flows and suspensions are said to fluidized when the fluid moves upward through the grains, thereby temporarily suspending them. Most flows are liquefied, and many references to fluidized sediment gravity flows are in fact incorrect and actually refer to liquefied flows.
- Debris flow or mudflow – Grains are supported by the strength and buoyancy of the matrix. Mudflows and debris flows have cohesive strength, which makes their behavior difficult to predict using the laws of physics. As such, these flows exhibit non-newtonian behavior. Because mudflows and debris flows have cohesive strength, unusually large clasts may be able to literally float on top of the mud matrix within the flow.
- Turbidity current – Grains are suspended by fluid turbulence within the flow. Because the behavior of turbidity currents is largely predictable, they exhibit newtonian behavior, in contrast to flows with cohesive strength (i.e., mudflows and debris flows). The behavior of turbidity currents in subaqueous settings is strongly influenced by the concentration of the flow, as closely packed grains in high-concentration flows are more likely to undergo grain-to-grain collisions and generate dispersive pressures as a contributing sediment support mechanism, thereby keep additional grains in suspension. Thus, it is useful to distinguish between low-density and high-density turbidity currents. A powder snow avalanche is essentially a turbidity current in which air is the supporting fluid and suspends snow granules in place of sand grains.

== Resulting deposits ==
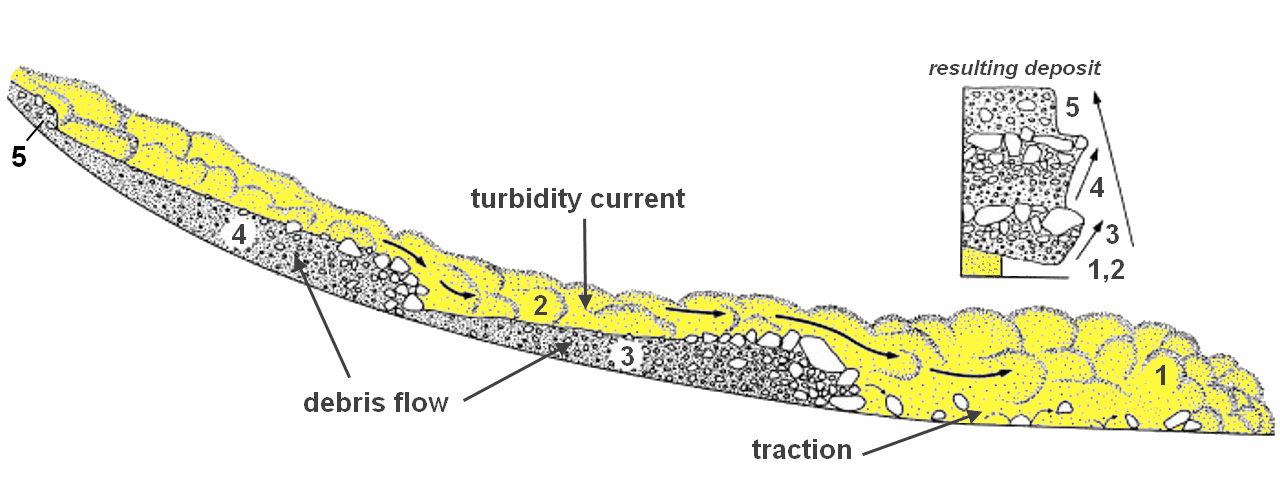
Diagram showing debris flow, turbidity current and traction processes in a single sediment gravity flow. The resulting deposit, which some geologists call a linked debrite, exhibits features of all three processes.

=== Description ===
Although the deposits of all four types of sediment support mechanisms are found in nature, pure grain flows are largely restricted to aeolian settings, whereas subaqueous environments are characterized by a spectrum of flow types with debris flows and mud flows on one end of the spectrum, and high-density and low-density turbidity currents on the other end. It is also useful in subaqueous environments to recognize transitional flows that are in between turbidity currents and mud flows. The deposits of these transitional flows are referred to by a variety of names, some of the more popular being "hybrid-event beds (HEB)", linked debrites" and "slurry beds". Powder snow avalanches and glowing avalanches (gas-charged flows of super heated volcanic ash) are examples of turbidity currents in non-marine settings.

- Grain flow deposits are characterized by a coarsening-upward distribution of grain sizes (inverse grading) within the bed. This results from smaller grains within the flow falling down in between larger grains during grain-to-grain collisions, and thereby depositing preferentially at the base of flow. Although present as grain avalanches in terrestrial sand dunes, grain flows are rare in other settings. However, inverse graded beds resulting from grain flow processes do make up so-called "traction carpets" in the lower intervals of some high-density turbidites.
- Liquefied flow deposits are characterized by de-watering features, such as dish structures, that result from upward escaping fluid within the flow. As with pure grain flows, pure liquefied flows seldom occur on their own. However, liquefied flow processes are very important as grains within turbidity currents begin to settle out and displace fluid upwards. This dish structures and related features, such de-watering pipes, are often found in turbidites.
- Debris flow deposits are characterized by a bimodal distribution of grain sizes, in which larger grains and/or clasts float within a matrix of fine-grained clay. Because the muddy matrix has cohesive strength, unusually large clasts may be able to float on top of the muddy material making up the flow matrix, and thereby end up preserved on the upper bed boundary of the resulting deposit.
- Low-density turbidity current deposits (turbidites) are characterized by a succession of sedimentary structures referred to as the Bouma sequence, which result from decreasing energy within the flow (i.e., waning flow), as the turbidity current moves downslope.
- High-density turbidity current deposits are characterized by much coarser grain size than in low-density turbidites, with the basal portions of the deposits often characterized by features that result from the close proximity of the grains to each other. Thus, indications of grain-to-grain interactions (i.e., grain flow processes), and interaction of grains with the substratum (i.e., traction) are generally present in the lower portions of these deposits. Complete Bouma sequences are rare, and generally only the Bouma A and B layers are evident.
- Hybrid event beds (HEB) transitional between mud flows and turbidity currents are characterized by features indicative of both cohesionless (turbulence-supported) and cohesive (mud-supported) flow with no separating bed boundary between the two. In most cases, they are represented by grain-supported textures that grade upward within the bed into mud-supported textures. It is not uncommon for debris flows and mud flows to evolve downslope into turbidity currents, and vice versa. Also, flows internally may transition upward from one flow process to another.

=== Modern and ancient examples ===
Modern and ancient (outcrop) examples of deposits resulting from different types of sediment gravity flows.

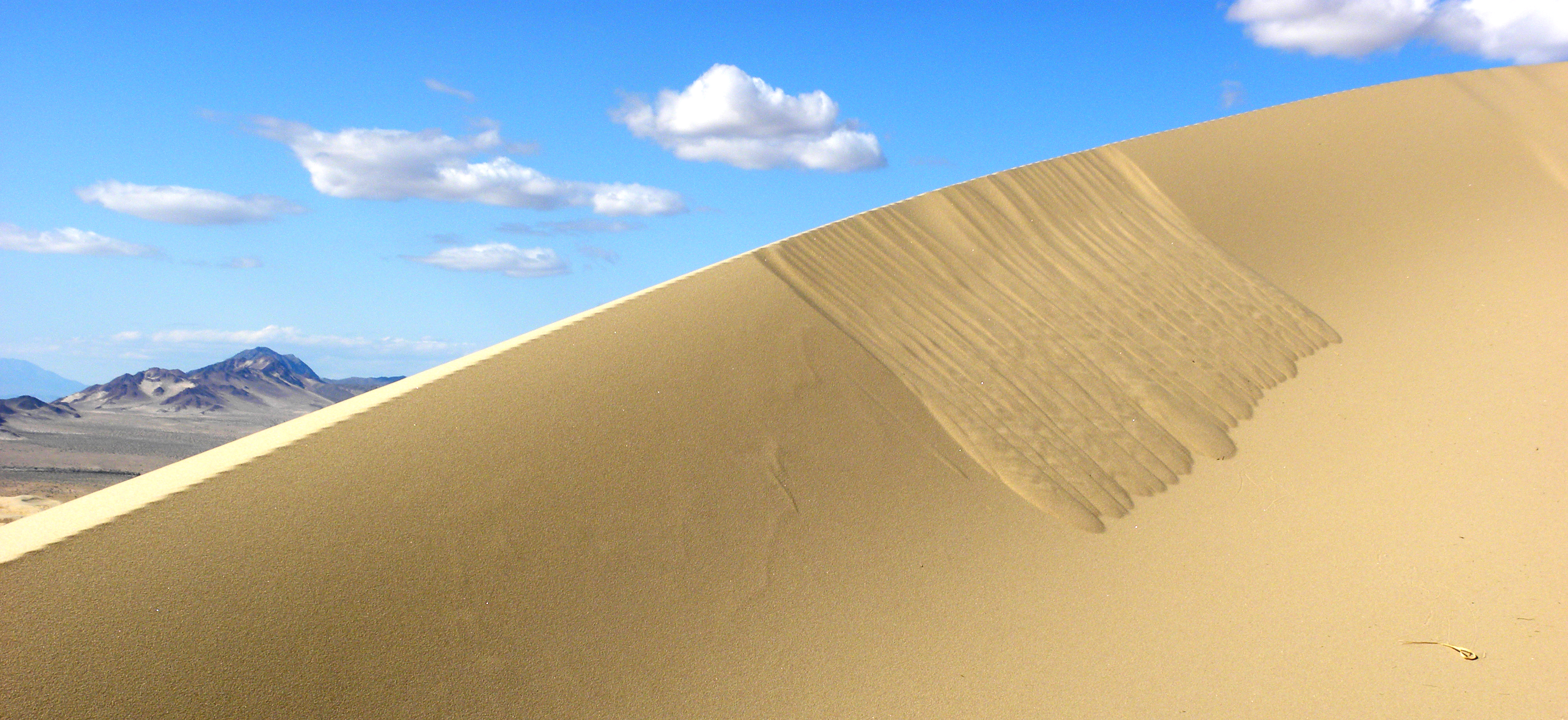
Grain flows (sand avalanches) on the slip faces of sand dunes at Kelso in the Mojave Desert, California

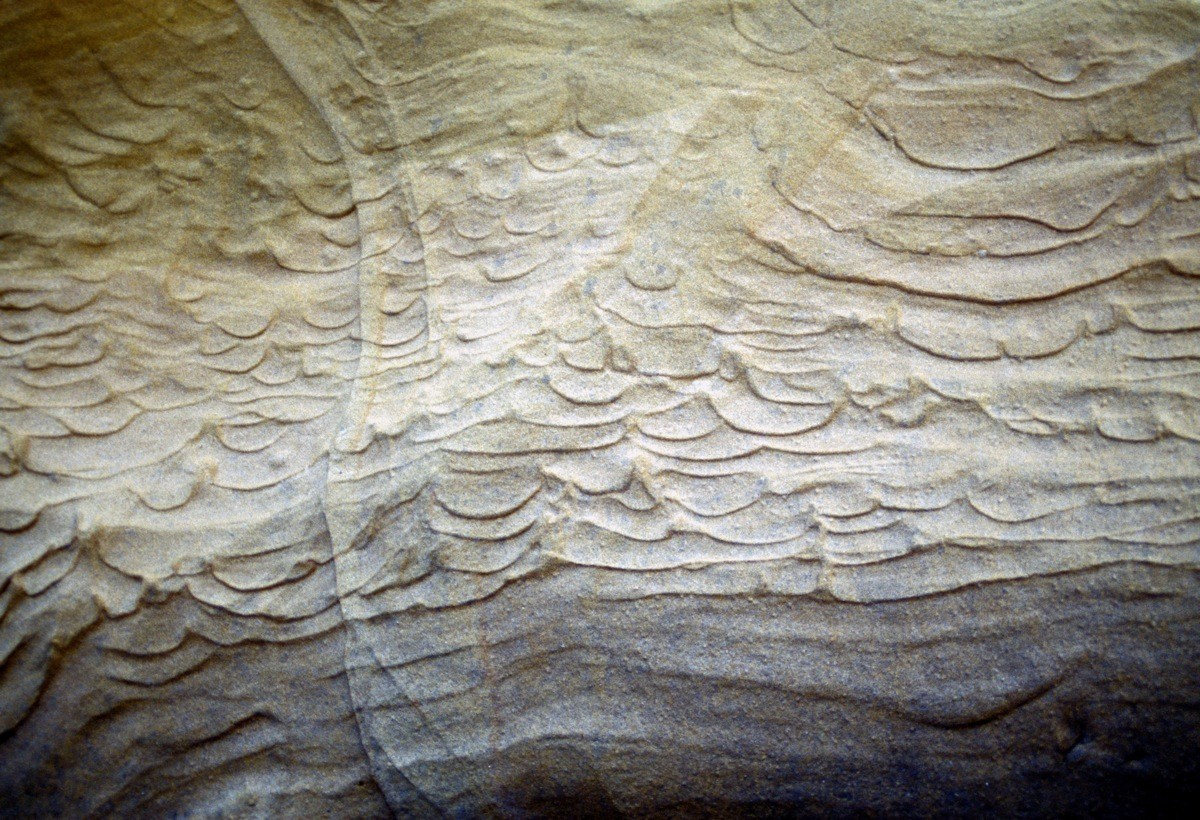
Dish structures in the deposit (Bouma A, Lowe S3) of an ancient liquefied sediment flow preserved in outcrop.

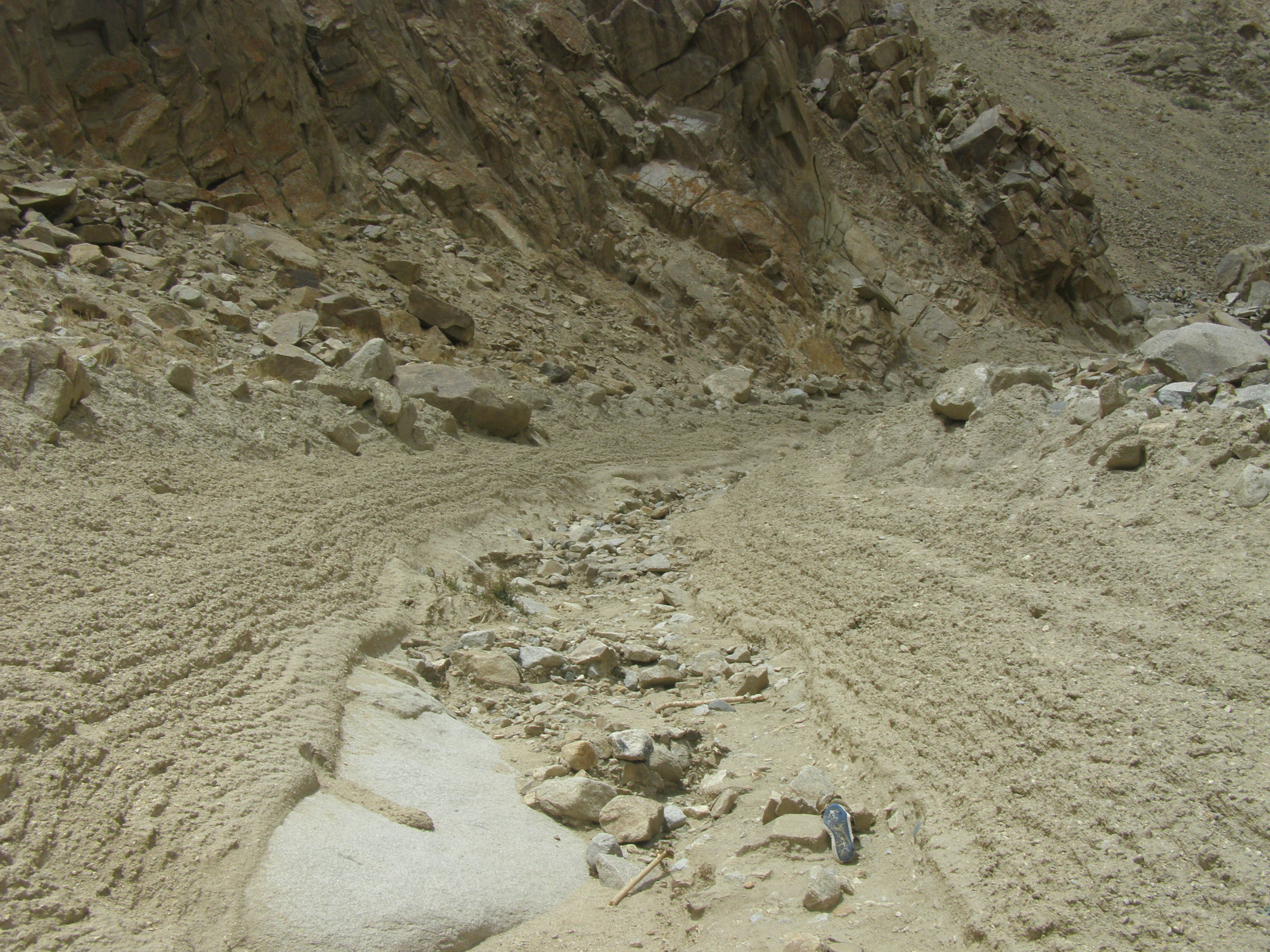
Debris flows filling a gully after intense storms of 2010 in Ladakh in the Himalayas.

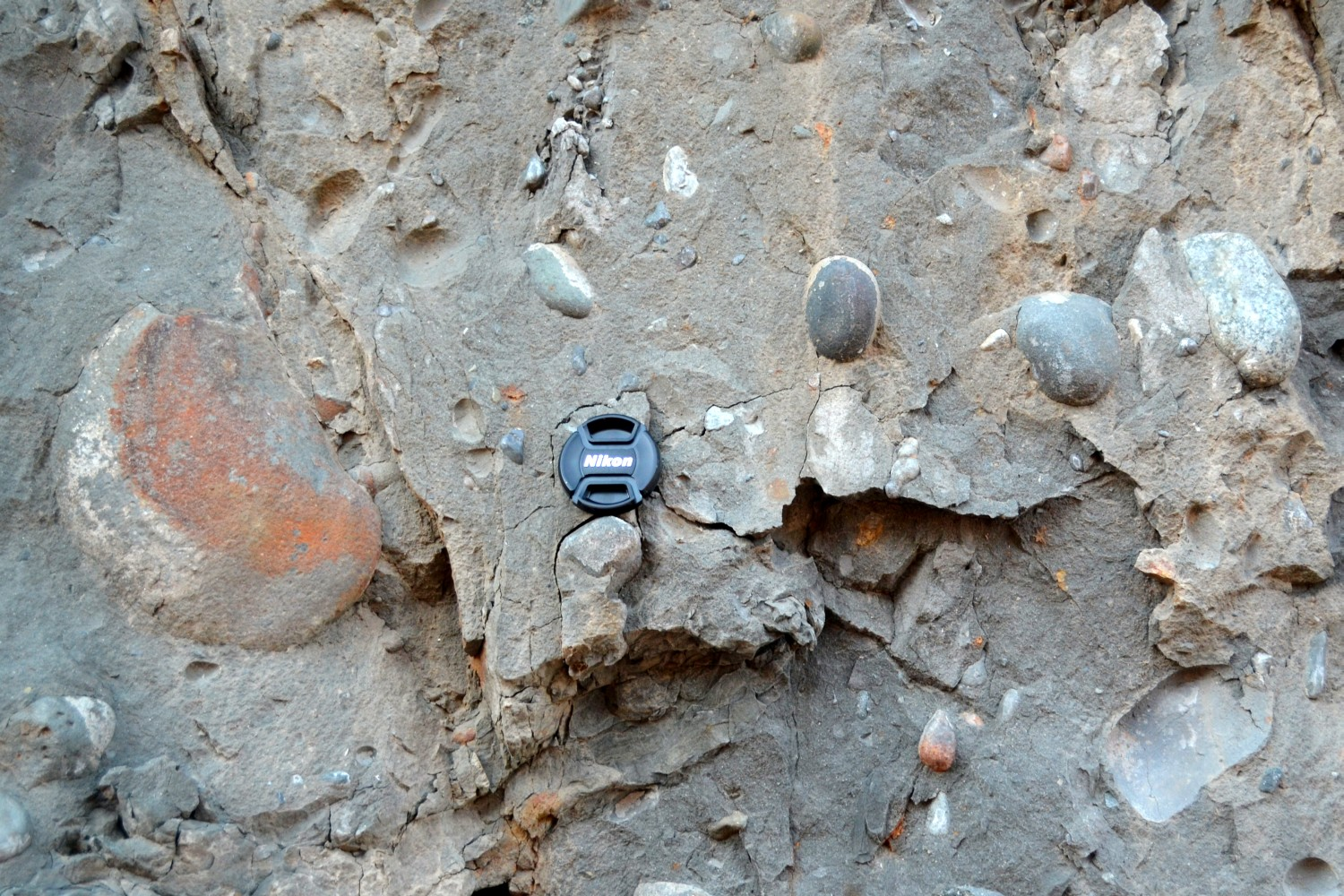
Debris flow deposit in outcrop showing free-floating large clasts suspended in a clay matrix.

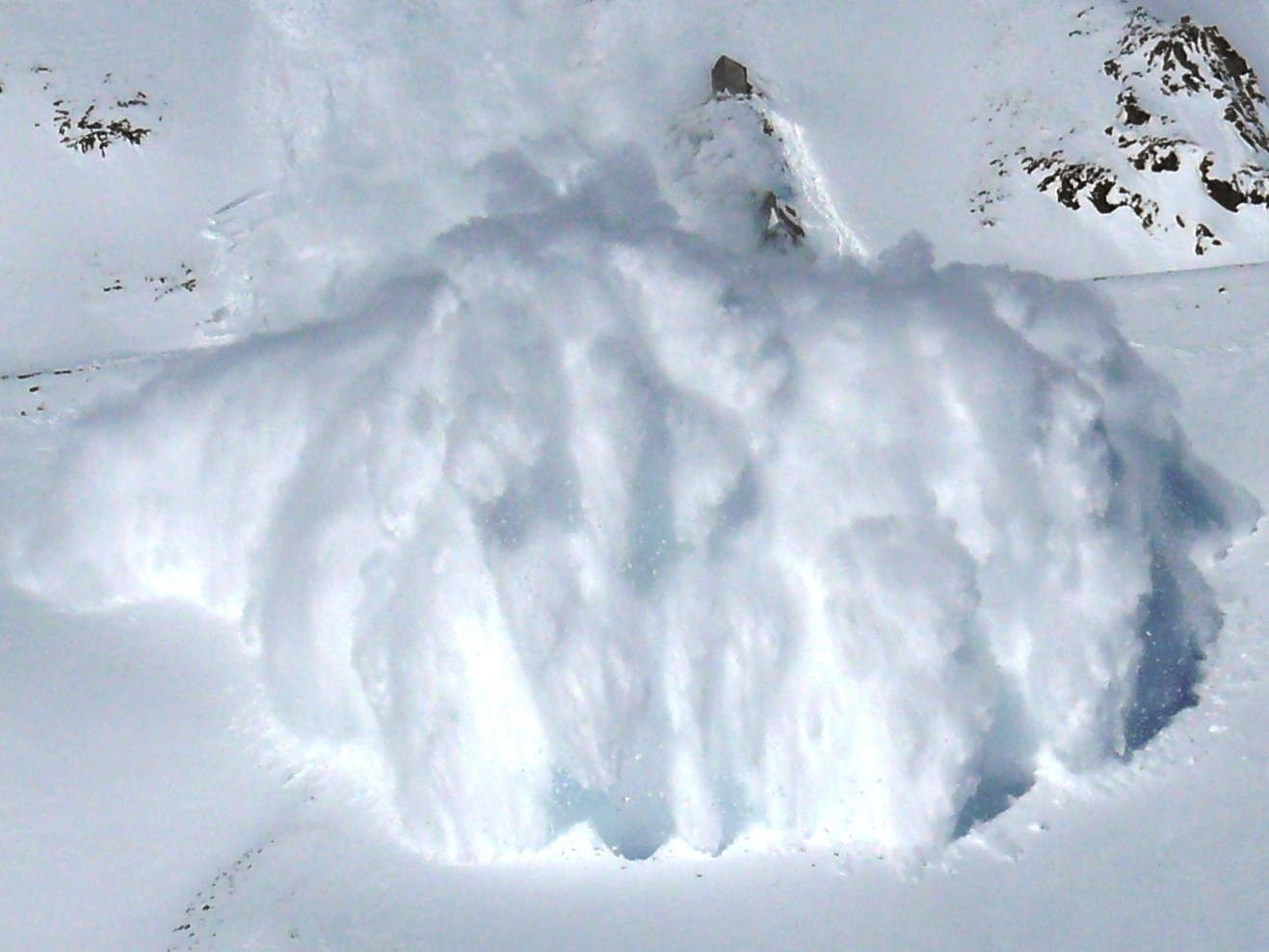
A powder snow avalanche is a form of turbidity current where air is the supporting fluid.

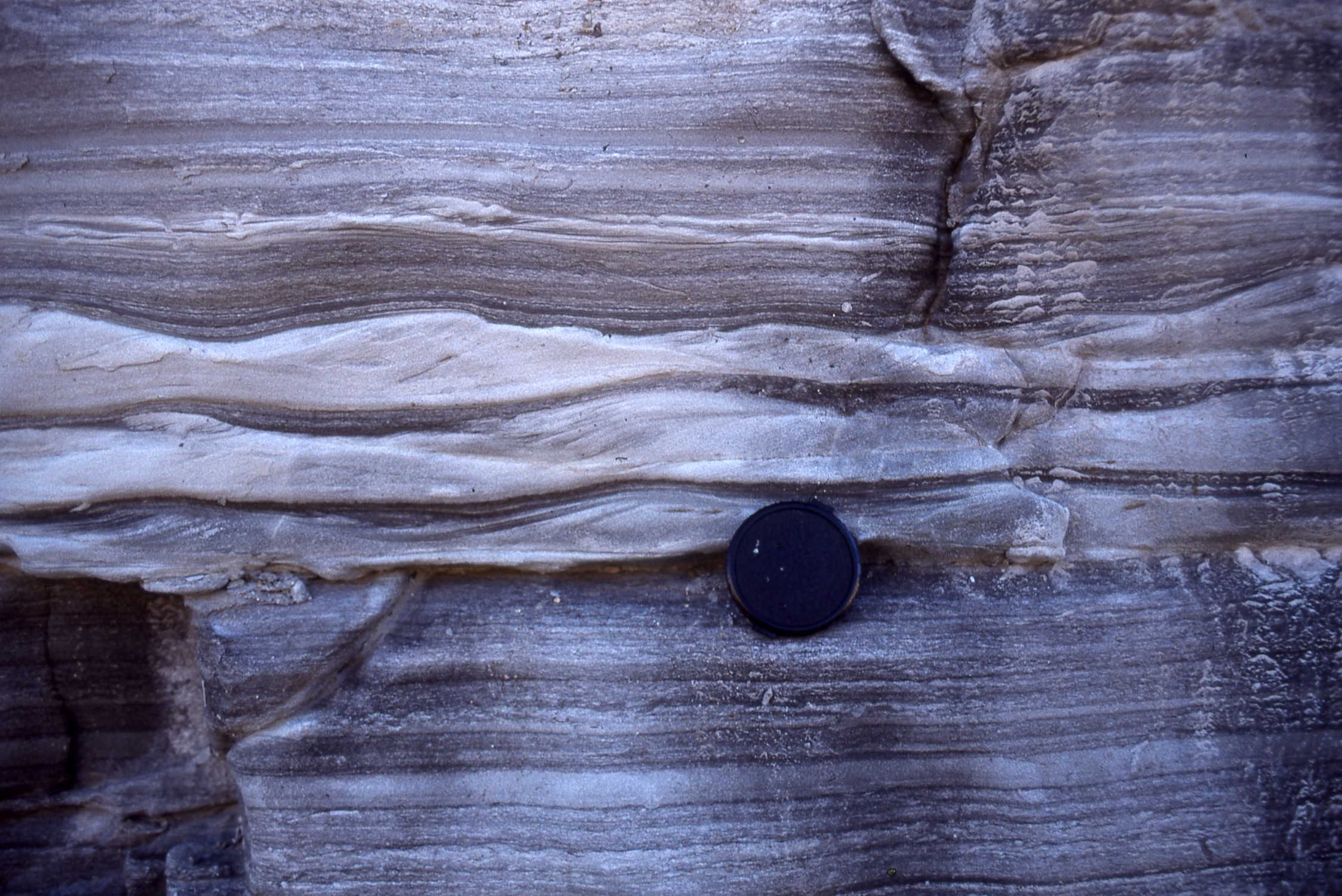
Fine-grained turbidites in outcrop showing Bouma B-D layers deposited by low-density turbidity currents.

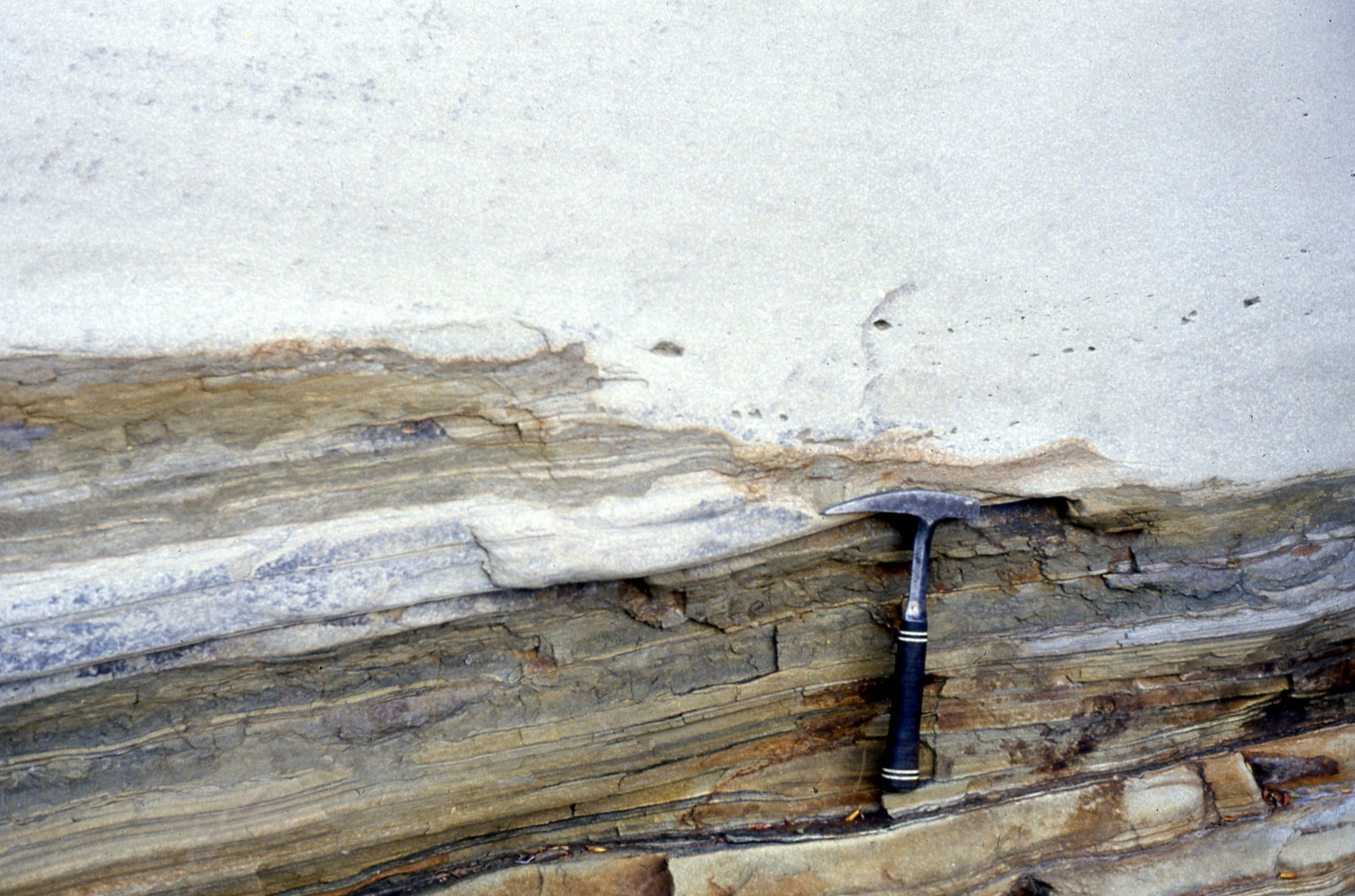
High-density turbidite (Bouma A, Lowe S1) cutting into low-density turbidites, Topatopa Mountains, California.

== Significance ==
Sediment gravity flows, primarily turbidity currents, but to a lesser extent debris flows and mud flows, are thought to be the primary processes responsible for depositing sand on the deep ocean floor. The emplacment of the deposits produced by the gravity flows may affect the seafloor communities, for example, by plugging burrows or disrupt their habitabt, as well as modifying the chemistry of the porewaters.

Because anoxic conditions at depth in the deep oceans are conducive to the preservation of organic matter, which with deep burial and subsequent maturation through the absorption of heat can generate oil and gas, the deposition of sand in deep ocean settings can ultimately juxtapose petroleum reservoirs and source rocks. In fact, a significant portion of the oil and gas produced in the world today is found in deposits (reservoirs) originating from sediment gravity flows.

== See also ==
- Bouma sequence
- High-density turbidity current (Lowe sequence)
- Pyroclastic flow
- Turbidite
- Turbidity current
