= Grain flow =

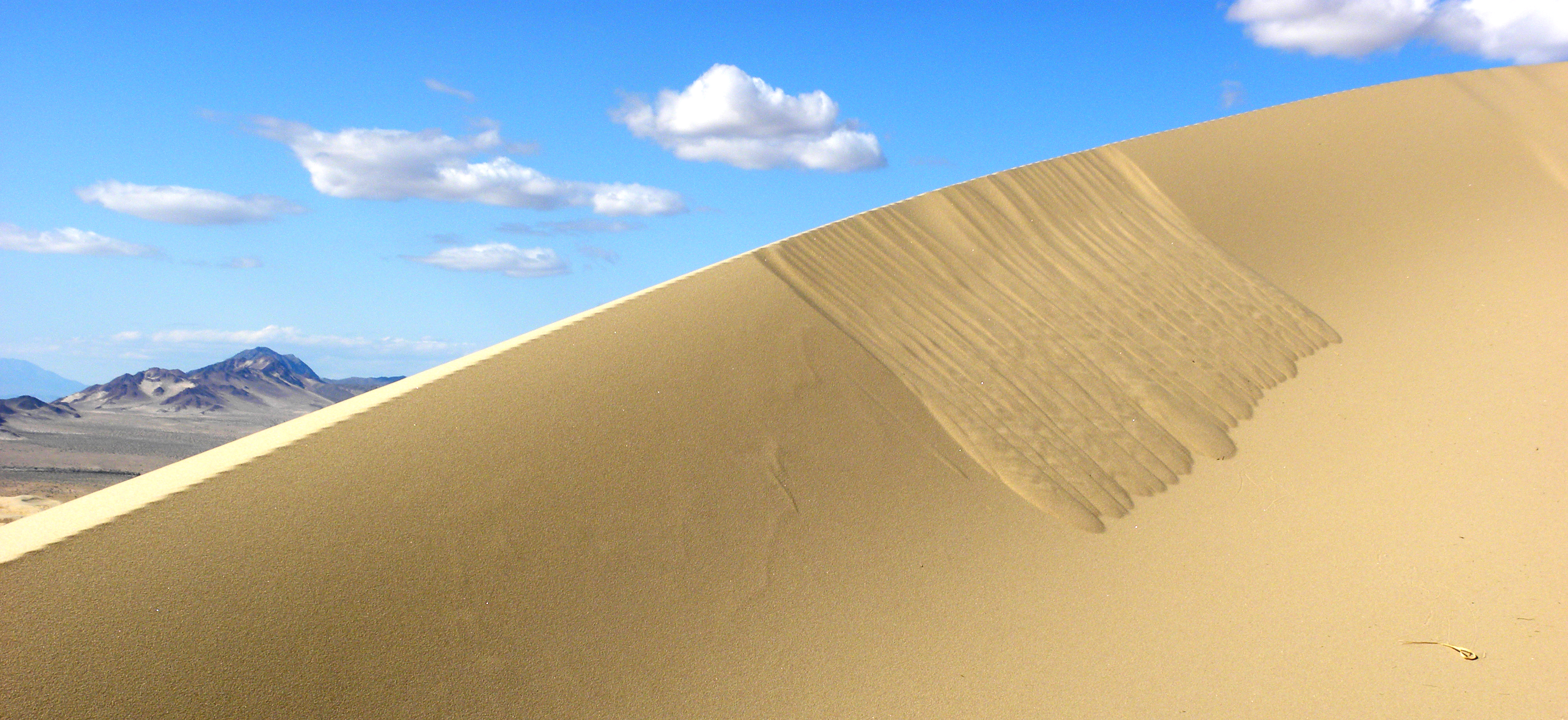
Grain flows (sand avalanches) on the slip faces of sand dunes at Kelso in the Mojave Desert, California.

A grain flow is a type of sediment-gravity flow in which the fluid can be either air or water, acts only as a lubricant, and grains within the flow remain in suspension due to grain-to-grain collisions that generate a dispersive pressure to prevent further settling. Grain flows are very common in aeolian settings as grain avalanches on the slip faces of sand dunes. By contrast, pure grain flows are rare in subaqueous settings, where the grains in a flow are generally held in suspension dominantly by traction, saltation, fluid turbulence and/or grain buoyancy when the grains are floating in the clay matrix of a mud flow. However, grain-to-grain collisions are very important as a contributing process of sediment support in subaqueous, sand-rich, high-density turbidity currents. The high concentrations of sand that develop at the base of high-density flows brings grains close enough together that frequent grain-to grain collisions are inevitable and result in layers of sediment that are inverse graded as the smaller grains are able to fall in between larger grains and settle out beneath them.

== In metallurgy ==
In metallurgy, the grain flow refers to the plastic deformation of crystallites during rolling or forging.
