= Overbank =

Alluvial geological deposit

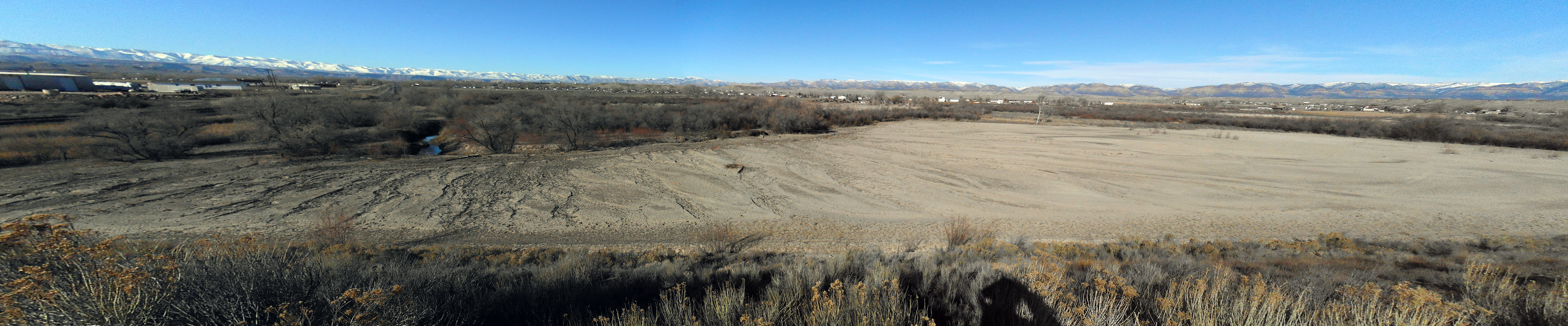
Example of overbank deposit, Price River, Utah

An overbank is an alluvial geological deposit consisting of sediment that has been deposited on the floodplain of a river or stream by flood waters that have broken through or overtopped the banks. The sediment is carried in suspension, and because it is carried outside of the main channel, away from faster flow, the sediment is typically fine-grained. An overbank deposit usually consists primarily of fine sand, silt and clay. Overbank deposits can be beneficial because they refresh valley soils.

Overbank deposits can also be referred to as floodplain deposits. Examples include natural levees and crevasse splays.

== Geomorphology ==
Floodplains are far wider than the channel they border, reaching widths of up to 100 kilometers, and their length is 10 times that. They are thin and roughly planar in shape. Unlike channel bars, which often build horizontally, overbank deposits build vertically.

== Depositional processes and facies ==
Overbank deposits are fine-grained and accumulate vertically. The disturbance of adjacent environments during flooding events leads to deposits containing terrestrial organic debris such as plant matter, and the intervening dry periods allow subaerial bioturbation by roots and burrowing animals. Notable sub-environments within the floodplain include natural levees and crevasse splays.

=== Natural levees ===
Natural levees are sloped deposits which form on the banks of channels during flooding events, serving as barriers to future floods. The slope of a levee is primarily a function of its grain size. Levees tend to be steeper when they first form and are close to the channel, then gradually level out as they grow and their grain size decreases. In the stratigraphic record, natural-levee deposits typically consist of thinly-layered sandstones overlying mud- to clay-sized beds.

=== Crevasse splays ===
Crevasse-splay deposits form during flooding events when a river cuts a levee to form a smaller channel away from the main channel. These crevasse channels are essentially miniature distributary systems and can have many of the features that larger fluvial bodies possess, like levees. A crevasse-splay sequence typically begins with an erosive base, followed by the deposition of coarse bed load sediment and transitioning to finer suspended sediment as energy decreases, resulting a graded bedding pattern when viewed in cross-section. Crevasse channels are ephemeral, and their deposits commonly show terrestrial or desiccation features near the top such as mudcracks or roots.

== Relation to paleosols ==
Because overbank deposits often overlie areas that are normally exposed to weathering, they can bury soils, allowing those soils to be preserved as paleosols. Paleosols can serve as bounds for overbank depositional sequences or alternate with overbank deposits where flooding is episodic. Paleosols tend to show more maturity at a greater distance from the channel, where there is less sediment flux. The degree of soil horizon development can be used as a proxy for this process.

== Controls on depositional system evolution ==
When a river changes course (avulsion), former floodplains can be stranded far from their former channel. They can be covered by new overbank deposits, cut by a channel, eroded completely, or converted into non-fluvial terrestrial deposits like soils.

Overbank deposits are climate-dependent. Of course, the frequency of floods has a major impact on overbank deposits. The controls on flood frequency are complex, but rainfall frequency is a major contributing factor. In humid environments, crevasse channels may empty into long-standing lakes or marshes, whereas in arid environments any drainage areas can dry up between flooding events. Tectonism can also affect the fluvial system by altering relative sea level, exposing floodplains or covering new areas with overbank deposits.

== See also ==
- Deposition (sediment)
- Sedimentary rock
