= Liquefied flow =

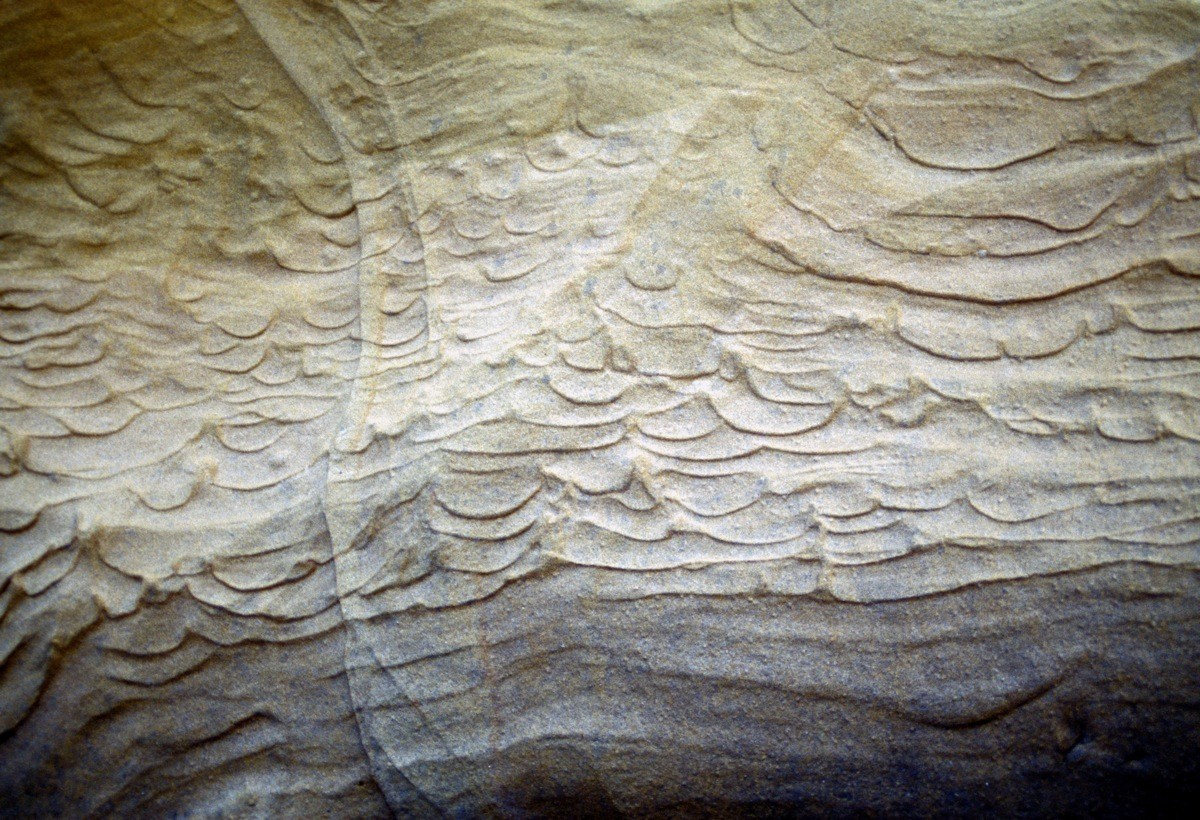
An ancient liquified sediment flow in Talara, Peru with nicely preserved dish structures.

Liquefied flows (also known as liquified flows and fluidized flows) are types of sediment-gravity flows in which grains within the flow are kept in suspension by the upward movement of fluid. They form in granular substances where the concentration of suspended mud is too low to develop cohesive forces within the flow. As grains at the base of the suspension settle out, fluid that is displaced upward by the settling generates pore fluid pressures that can help suspend grains in the upper part of the flow. Application of an external pressure to the suspension will initiate flow. This external pressure can be applied by a seismic shock, which may turn transform loose sand into a highly viscous suspension as in quicksand. Generally as soon as the flow begins to move, fluid turbulence results and the flow rapidly evolves into a turbidity current. Flows and suspensions are said to be liquefied when the grains settle downward through the fluid and displace the fluid upwards. By contrast, flows and suspensions are said to fluidized when the fluid moves upward through the grains, thereby temporarily suspending them. Most flows are liquefied, and many references to fluidized sediment gravity flows are in fact incorrect and actually refer to liquified flows. Because fluid is displaced upward in these types of flows, dewatering features such as dish structures, pillars, pipes and dikes are common.
