= Bouma sequence =

Set of structures in sediments or sedimentary rocks

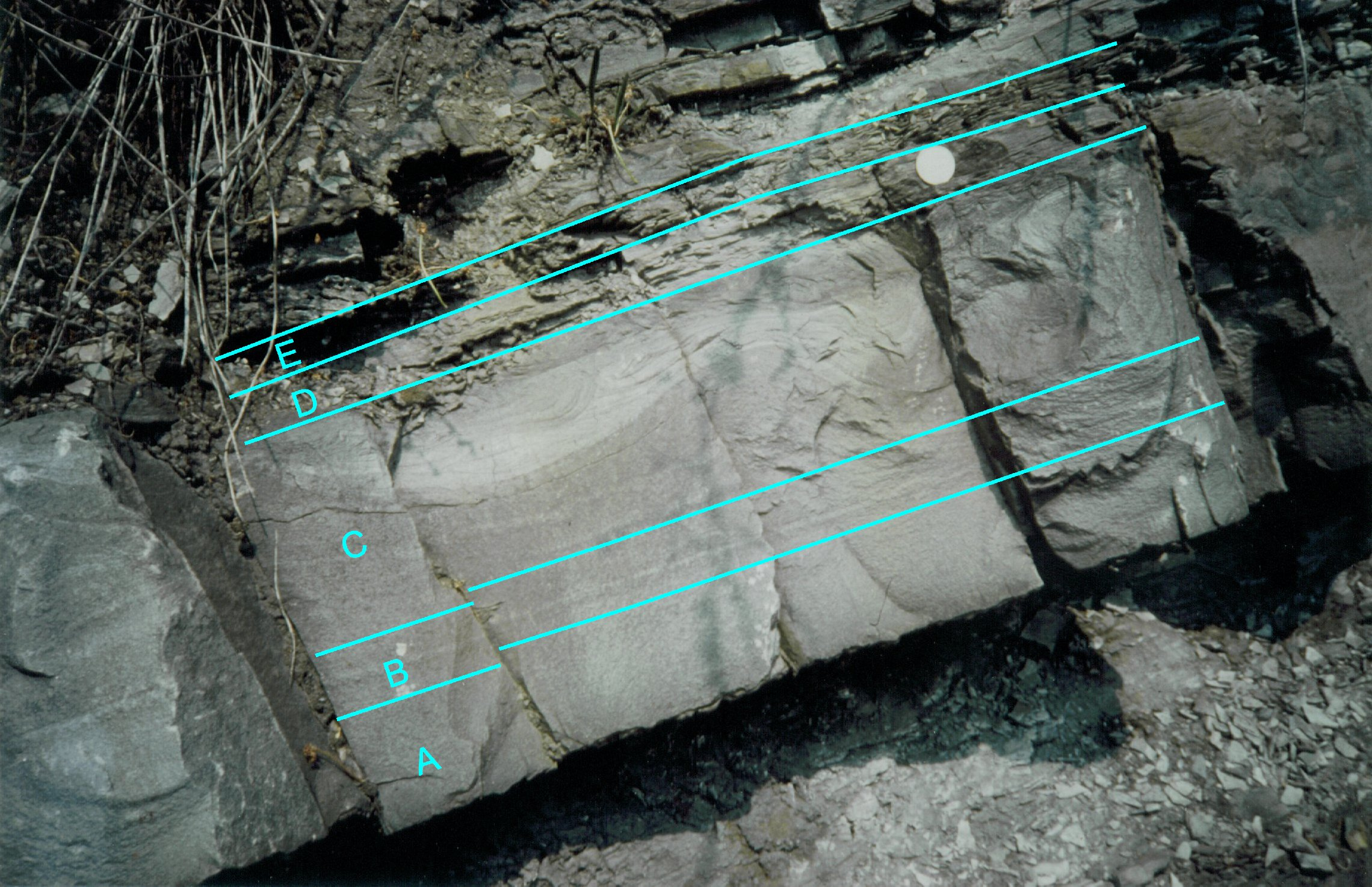
Turbidite from the Devonian-age Becke-Oese Sandstone, Germany showing a complete Bouma sequence.

The Bouma sequence (named after Arnold H. Bouma, 1932–2011) describes a classic set of sedimentary structures in turbidite beds deposited by turbidity currents at the bottoms of lakes, oceans and rivers.

== Description ==
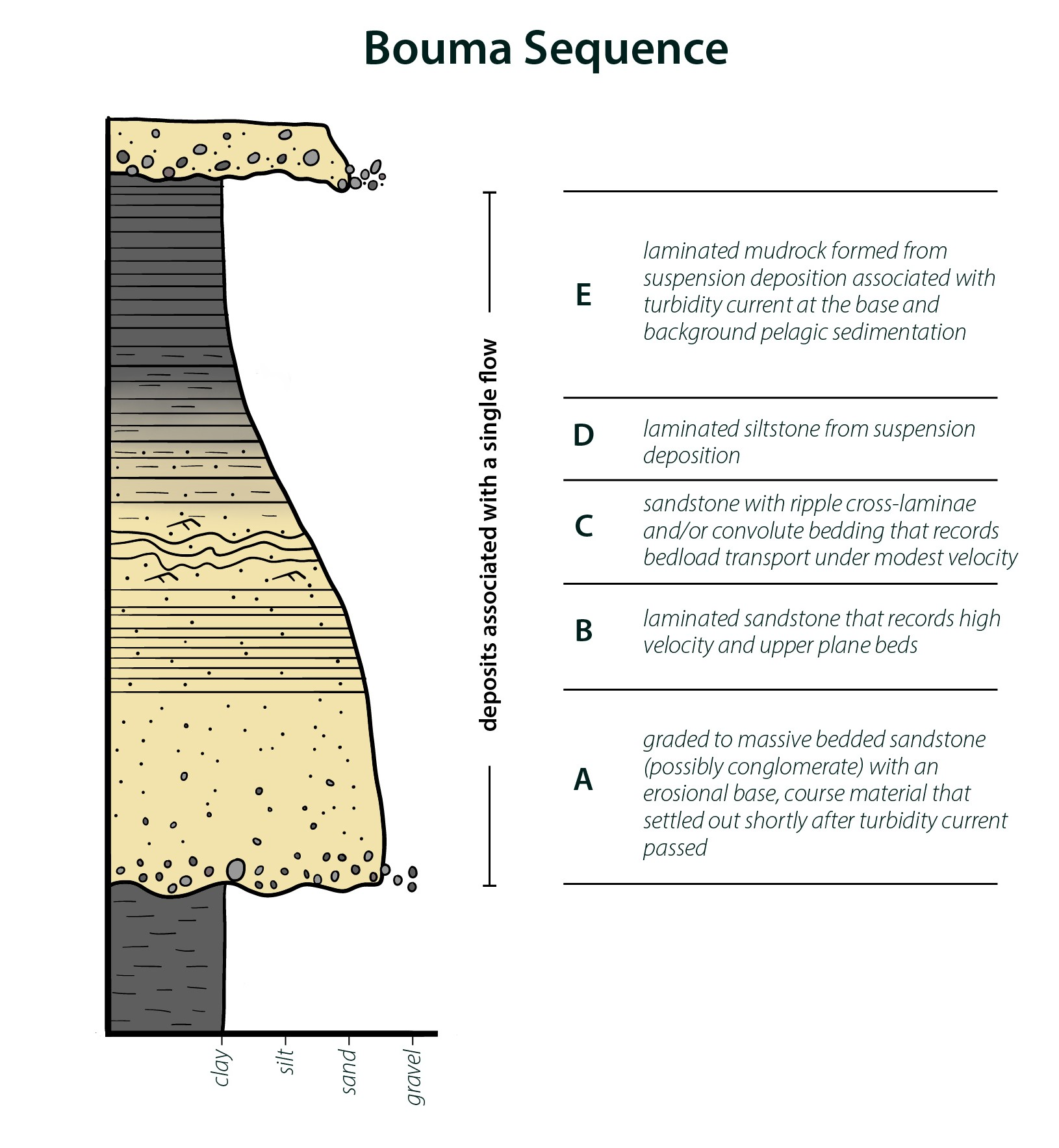
Stratigraphic column of a Bouma sequence

The Bouma sequence specifically describes the ideal vertical succession of structures deposited by low-density (i.e., low sand concentration, fine-grained) turbidity currents. An alternate classification scheme that is generally called the Lowe sequence exists for the ideal vertical sequence of structures deposited by high-density flows.

The Bouma sequence is divided into 5 distinct layers labelled A through E, with A being at the bottom and E being at the top. Each layer described by Bouma has a specific set of sedimentary structures and a specific lithology (see below), with the layers overall getting finer-grained from bottom to top. Most turbidites found in nature have incomplete sequences, but a complete sequence consists of the following layers:

- E: Massive, ungraded mudstone, sometimes with evidence of trace fossils (i.e., bioturbation). The Bouma E layer is often missing, or difficult to differentiate from the Bouma D layer below.
- D: Parallel-laminated siltstone.
- C: Ripple-laminated fine-grained sandstone. Often the ripple laminations are deformed into convolute laminations and flame structures.
- B: Planar-laminated fine- to medium-grained sandstone. The base of Bouma B often has features known as sole markings, such as flute casts, groove casts and parting lineation.
- A: Massive to normally graded, fine- to coarse-grained sandstone, often with pebbles and/or rip-up clasts of shale near the base. Dish structures may be present. The base of the sandstone, below A, is sometimes eroded into underlying strata.

== Processes ==
The Bouma sequence is deposited during waning flow as turbidity currents move downslope. In other words, flows steadily lose energy as they react to changes in the slope of the surface over which they travel, and/or as flows move from being confined within a channel to unconfined when they exit the channel and spread out. Surges and/or hydraulic jumps caused by changes in slope can reinvigorate flows briefly to increase flow energy, but ultimately energy decreases as flows move away from their points of origin.

When energy within a flow is highest, it can carry the maximum amount of sediment and the largest grain sizes, but as energy decreases, the carrying capacity reduces, and the coarsest grains quickly settle out, sometimes almost instantaneously. High-energy flows may also erode into underlying beds, thereby incorporating new material into the flow, which will tend to decrease flow energy. Flows in channels can also undergo flow stripping, in which the upper part of the flow, where the finer grains tend to concentrate, separates and travels out over the top of the channel, leaving the lower part of the flow, where the coarser grains accumulate, within the channel. Ultimately, only clay particles remain, suspended in a stagnant water column with essentially no current movement.

As flows move downslope the following processes take place to create the layers of the Bouma sequence.

- Bouma E is the last layer deposited. It results from suspension settling where essentially no current exists. Clays generally remain suspended until the water chemistry changes and allows the clays to flocculate and settle out. Because the Bouma E layer, if deposited at all, is easily eroded by subsequent turbidity currents, it is often not present.
- Bouma D is deposited by suspension settling where a slight current exists. Subtle changes in current energy causes alternating laminations of coarser and finer grains of silt to settle out.
- Bouma C is deposited under lower flow regime conditions where there is enough energy for the flow to carry fine sand by saltation, wherein grains hop and bounce across the surface beneath the flow. As grains settle out, current ripples develop, with climbing ripples developing if sedimentation rates are high enough. If shear is imposed on the ripple beds by an earthquake and/or by an overlying turbidite/turbidity current, the ripple laminations can be deformed into convolute laminations and flame structures.
- Bouma B is deposited under upper flow regime conditions where energy is high enough to carry sand grains by traction, wherein they slide and roll across the surface beneath the flow. The current energy is such that sole marks such as groove casts, flute casts and parting lineation can form on top the bed beneath the flow, and be preserved as molds and casts on the underside of the Bouma B layer.
- Bouma A is the first layer deposited by a flow, provided the flow has sufficient energy. Otherwise Bouma B, C or D will be the first layer deposited. Bouma A is deposited when the flow energy is high enough that fluid turbulence is able to keep the coarsest grains in suspension. When energy drops below a critical level, the grains tend to settle out all at once to create a massive bed. If flow energy drops more slowly, then the coarse grains may settle out first, leaving the fine grains still in suspension. This results in coarse-tail graded bedding, which means that there is a bimodal distribution of grain sizes with the coarse grains becoming progressively smaller towards the top of the bed, and the finer grains being randomly distributed between the coarse grains (i.e., the finer grain sizes are ungraded). As grains settle out, water displaced by grain compaction can move upward to create dish structures. Also, erosion can take place at the base of the flow and tear up shale from an underlying bed so that shale-rip clasts are incorporated into the base of the Bouma A layer. If there is some buoyancy to the rip-up clasts, then they may form a layer some distance above the base of Bouma A.

== Examples ==
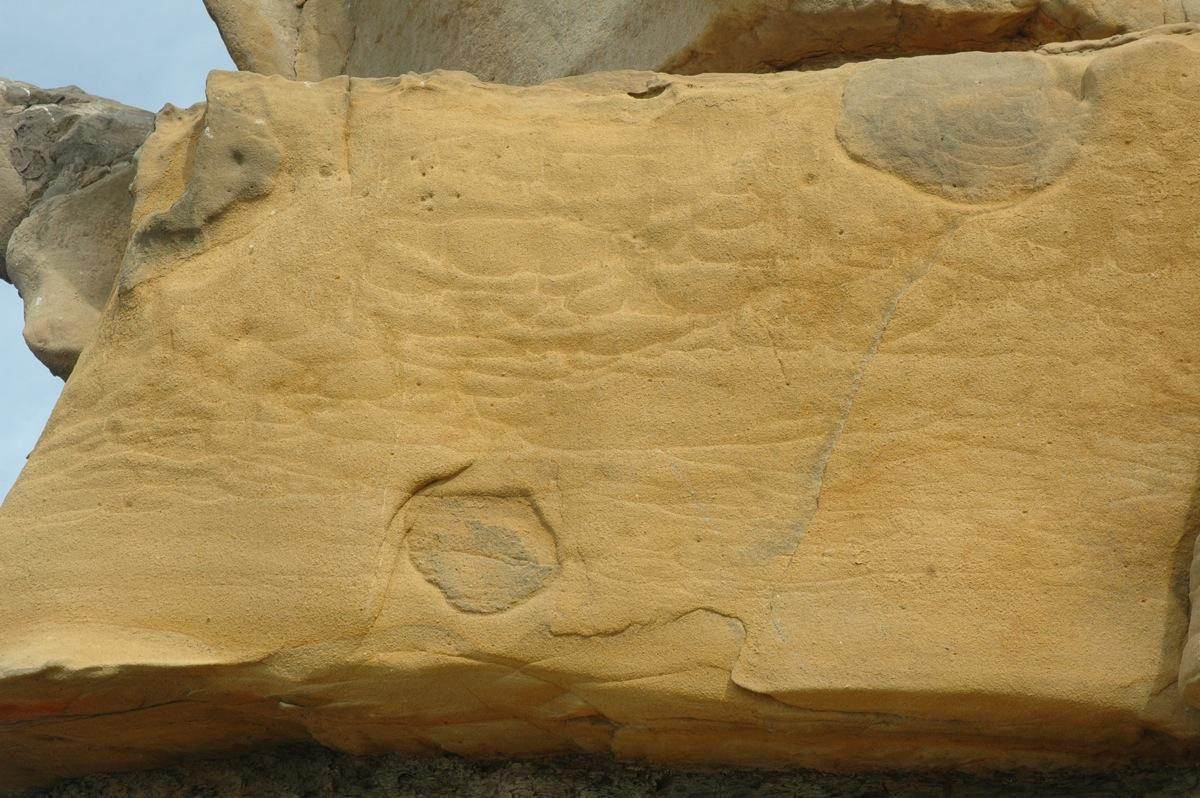
Bouma A interval of a turbidite showing dish structures with pillar structures between the dishes, Northern California.

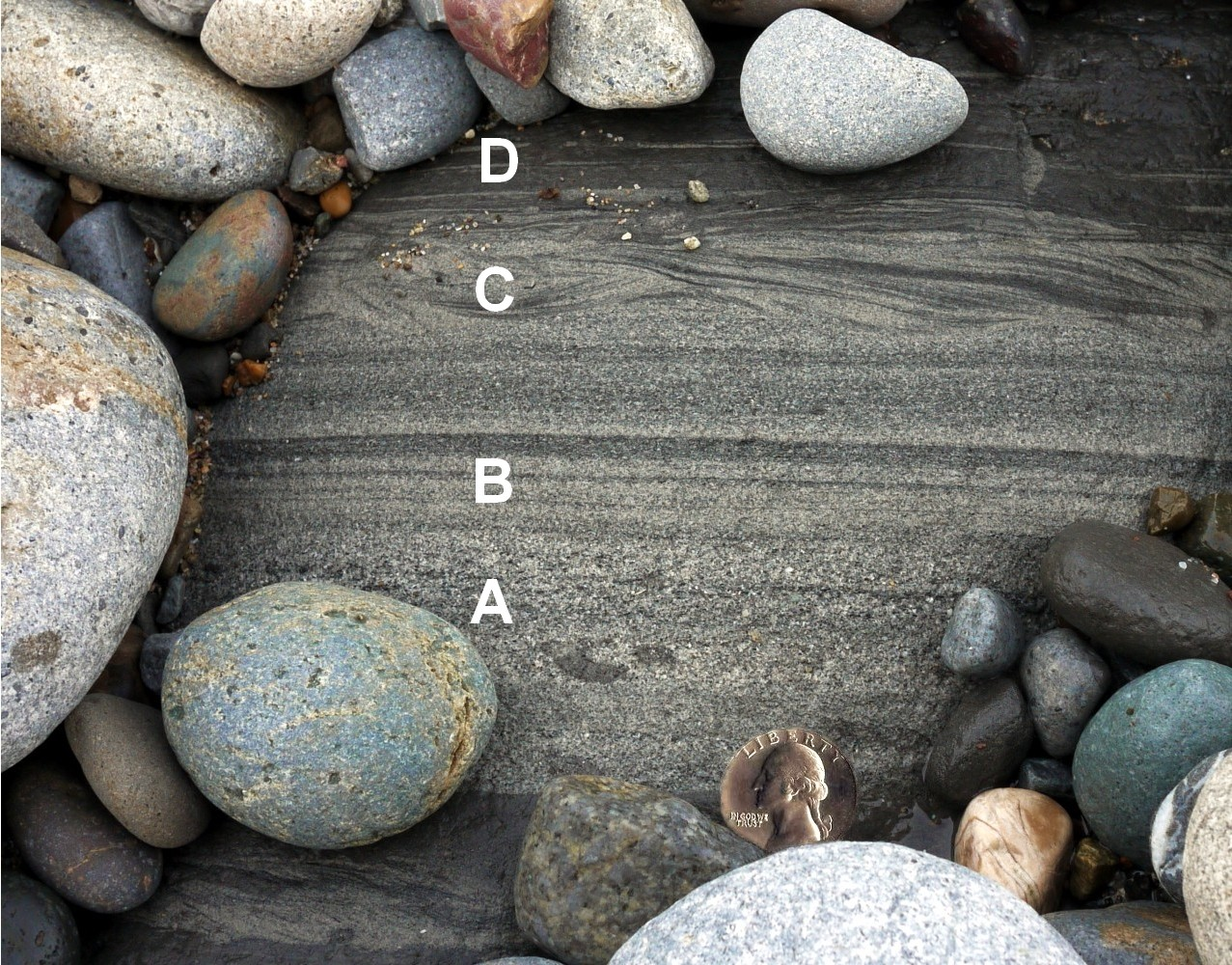
Cretaceous turbidite showing Bouma A-D layers. Pigeon Point Formation, Pescadero Beach, California.

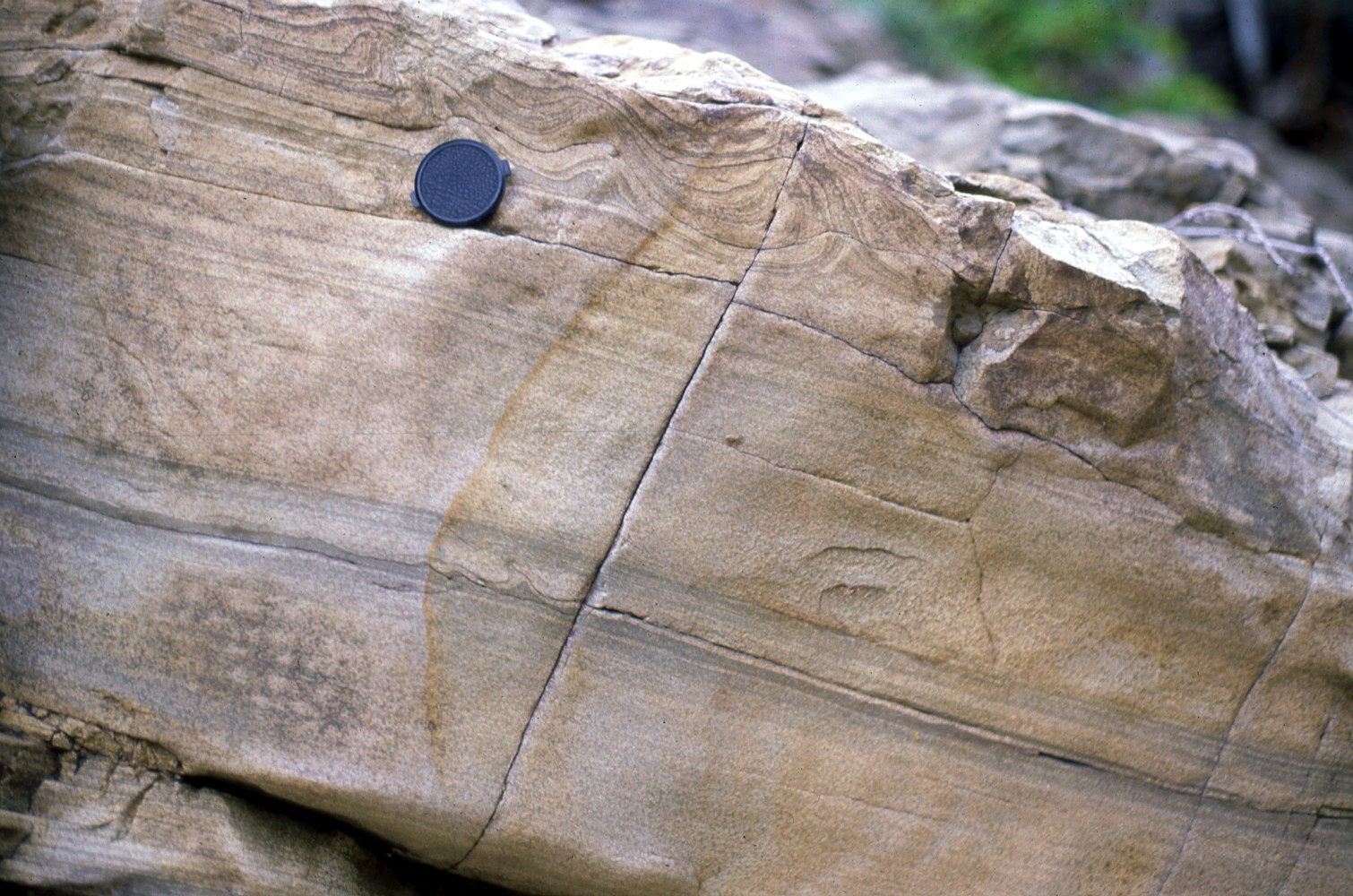
Bouma B and convolute-laminated Bouma C layers in a sandy turbidite. Cozy Dell Fm, Topatopa Mountains, California.

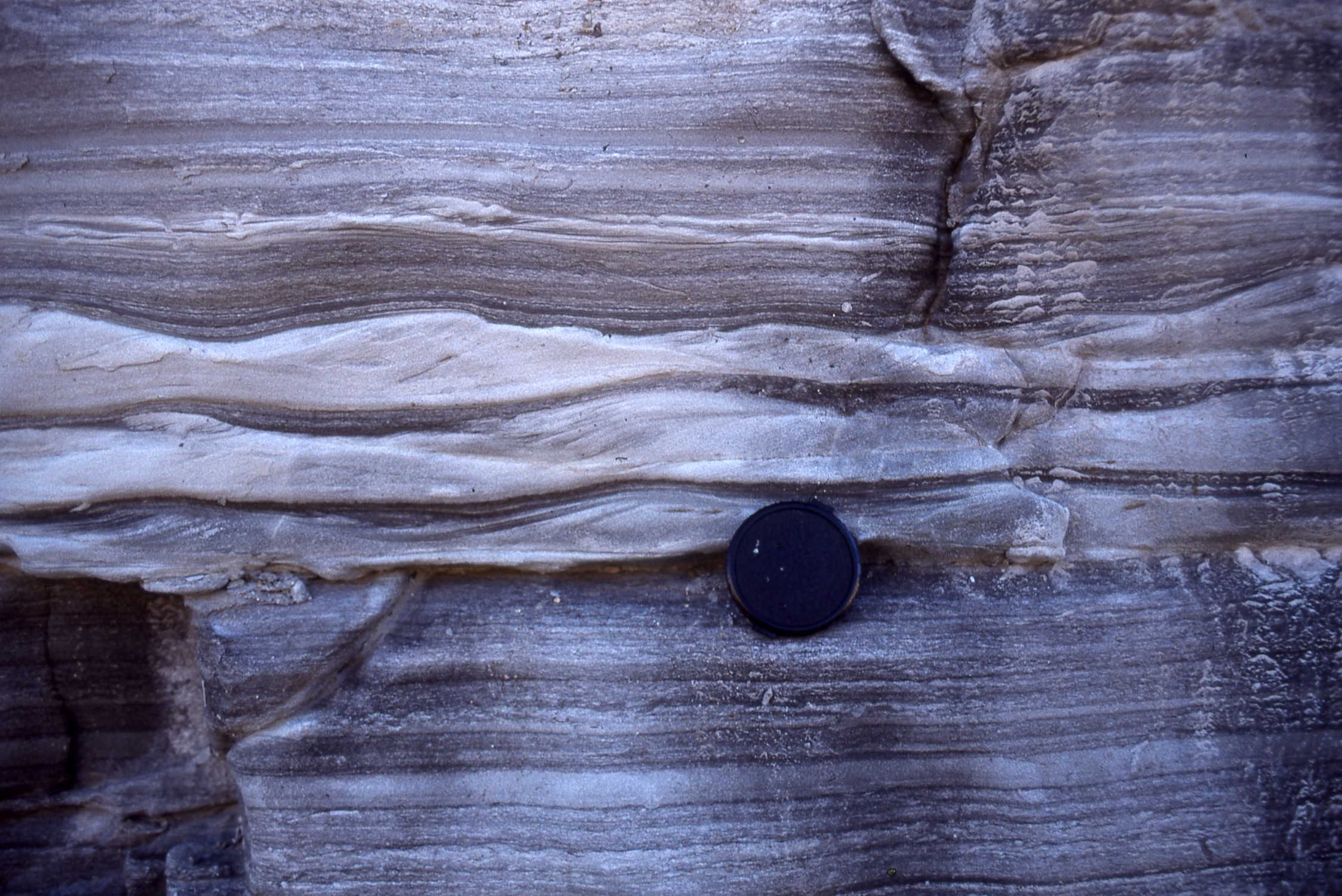
Bouma C-D layers of distal turbidites deposited in a levee crevasse splay. Venado Fm, Lake Berryessa, California.

== See also ==
- Sediment gravity flow
