= Crevasse splay =

Sediment deposited on a floodplain by a stream which breaks its levees

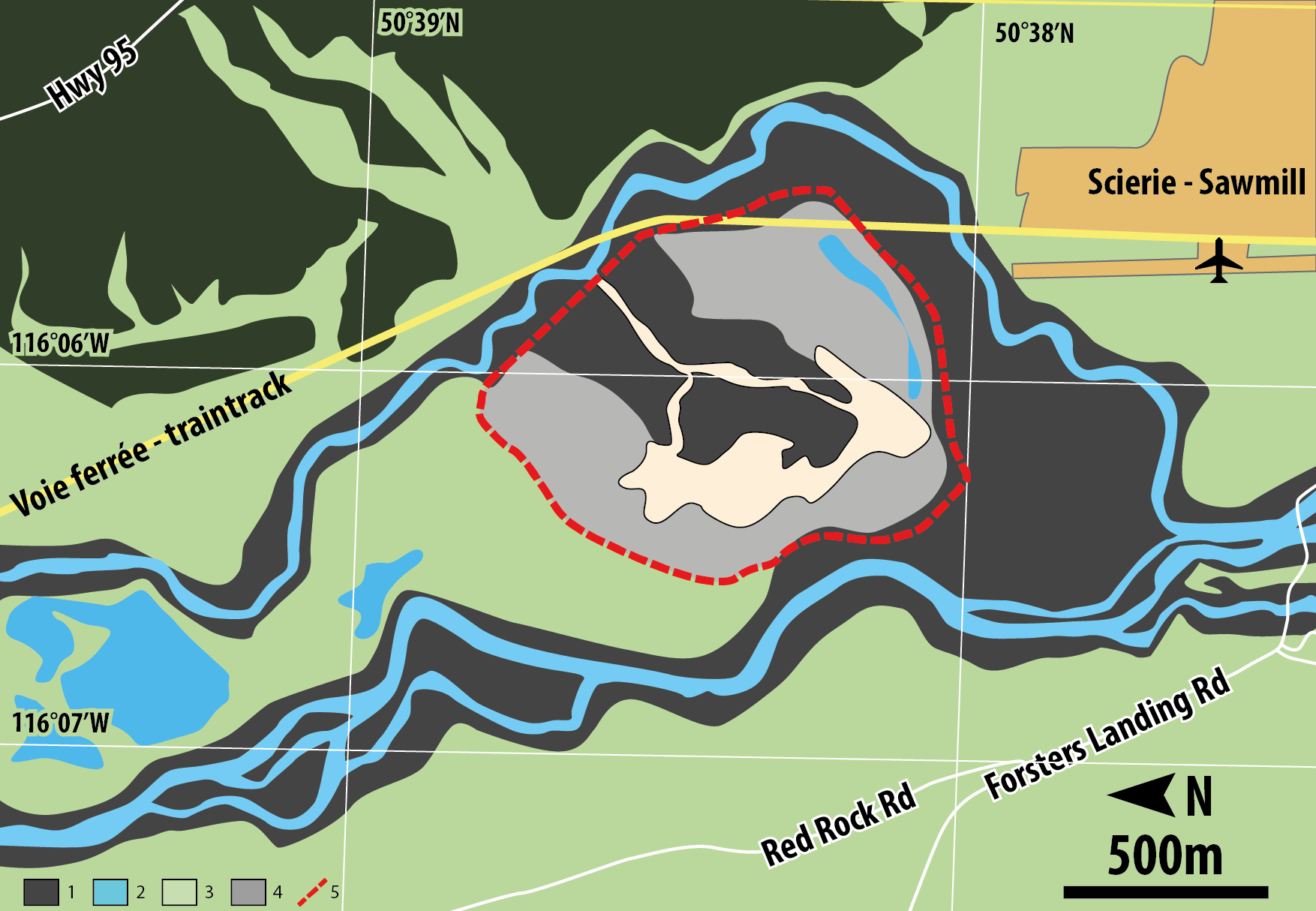
Crevasse splay on the Columbia River, Canada.: 1. levees; 2. active channel; 3. floodplain; 4. crevasse splay deposits; 5. crevasse splay extent

A crevasse splay is a sedimentary fluvial deposit that forms when a stream breaks its natural or artificial levees and deposits sediment on a floodplain. A breach that forms a crevasse splay deposits sediment in a pattern similar to that of an alluvial fan deposit. Once the levee has been breached the water flows out of its channel. As the water spreads onto the flood plain sediments will start to fall out of suspension as the water loses energy. The resulting deposition can create graded deposits similar to those found in Bouma sequences. In some cases crevasse splays can cause a river to abandon its old river channel, a process known as avulsion. Breaches that form a crevasse splay deposit occur most commonly on the outside banks of meanders where the water has the highest energy. Crevasse splay deposits can range in size. Larger deposits can be 6 m (20 ft) thick at the levee and spread 2 km (1.2 mi) wide, while smaller deposits may only be 1 cm (0.39 in) thick.

== See also ==
- Fluvial landforms – sediment processes associated with rivers and streams
- Meander – one of a series of curves in a channel of a matured stream
- Avulsion – rapid abandonment of a river channel and formation of a new channel
