= Lowe sequence =

Sedimentary structures in sandstone beds deposited by high-density turbidity currents

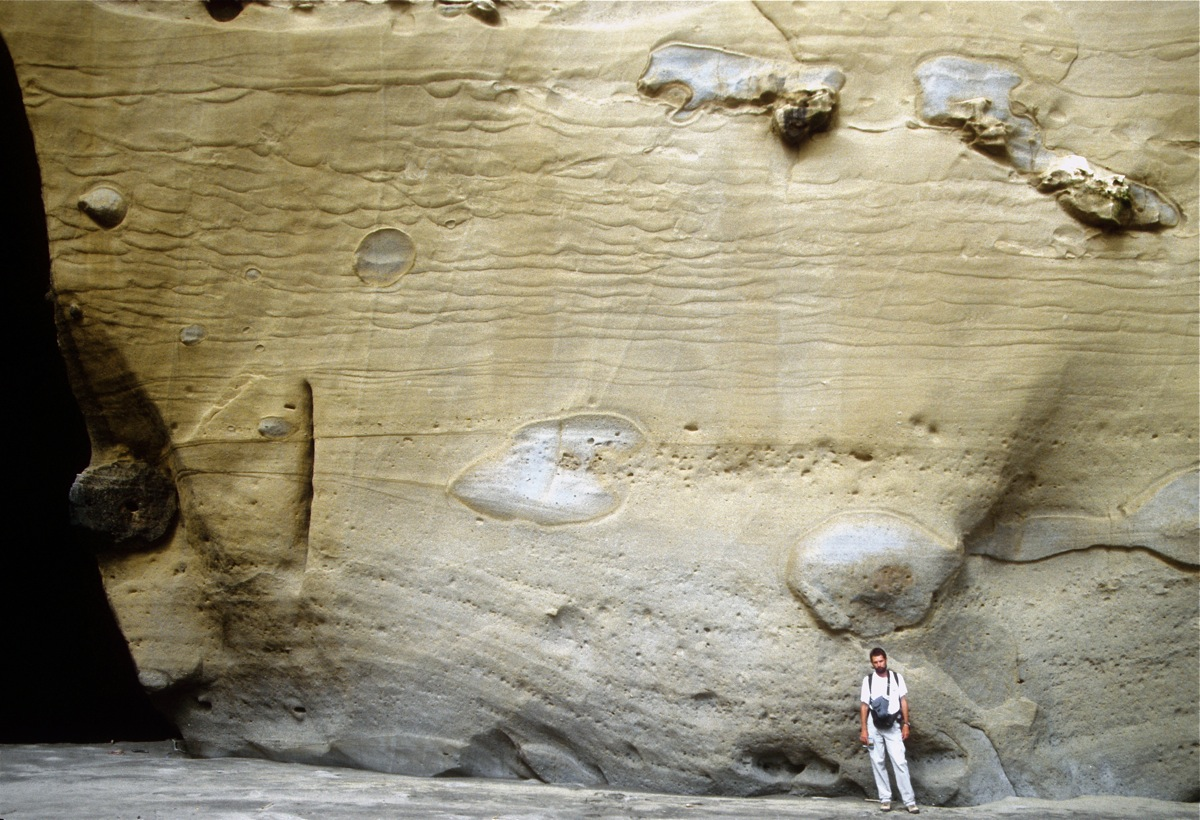
Layers S1-S3 in a high-density turbidite exposed near Talara, Peru

The Lowe sequence describes a set of sedimentary structures in turbidite sandstone beds that are deposited by high-density turbidity currents. It is intended to complement, not replace, the better-known Bouma sequence, which applies primarily to turbidites deposited by low-density (i.e., low-sand concentration) turbidity currents.

== Description ==
The Lowe sequence adds three layers, labelled S1 through S3, to Bouma's terminology, with S1 at the bottom and S3 at the top of a sandy turbidite bed. As with the Bouma sequence, each layer has a specific set of sedimentary structures and lithology. And, as in the Bouma sequence, the layers become finer-grained from bottom to top.

The layers are described as follows.

- S3 – Massive to graded, fine- to coarse-grained sandstones that overlie the S2 layer represent deposition from a turbulent suspension. Sometimes dish structures and dewatering pipes are present. This layer is essentially the same as the Bouma A layer.
- S2 – Inverse (reverse) graded, fine- to coarse-grained sandstone layers that overlie the S1 layer represent deposition as traction carpets, where grain-to-grain collisions are an important process.
- S1 – Sandstone to conglomerate that are at the base of the turbidite and display parallel-laminated to cross-laminated beds that indicate traction deposition, wherein the current moves grains, pebbles and large clasts by rolling and sliding them across the surface beneath the flow.

As previously mentioned, the Lowe sequence is intended to complement, not replace, the Bouma sequence. Fine-grained turbidites resulting from low-density turbidity currents, in which the Bouma A through Bouma E terminology applies, are referred to in the Lowe classification as Ta through Te, in which the T acronym derives from "Traction". By contrast, because the S1-S3 terminology describes sand-rich turbidites deposited by high-density turbidity currents, the S acronym derives from "Sandstone". Lastly, R1-R3, which uses the same descriptive criteria as S1-S3, applies to conglomerates, wherein the R acronym derives from "Rubble". In practice, the S1-S3 terminology is widely used, Ta-Te is used sometimes, and R1-R3 is seldom used.

== Processes ==
Initially, grains, pebbles and large clasts in a high-density turbidity current (i.e., a high-sand concentration flow) are moved by traction (rolling and sliding) to generate a coarse-grained to conglomeratic, parallel-laminated to cross-laminated S1 layer. However, as grains settle and move closer together, grain-to-grain collisions generate dispersive pressures that help prevent further settling. This results in smaller grains moving between larger grains and preferentially settling out beneath them. Thus, an inverse-graded layer develops, called a 'traction carpet', since it is thought to move as a single unit. At some point, the grains move close enough together that collisions no longer generate enough energy to keep the grains in suspension, and the entire layer freezes to create an S2 layer. This process can then repeat to create additional traction carpets.

When grains move closer together and settle, the water between them is displaced, allowing it to rise into the flow and help keep grains above the traction carpets in suspension. Because the flow is in motion, the fluid's upward movement quickly becomes turbulent. When the flow's energy drops low enough that it can no longer sustain turbulence, the entire flow 'freezes,' creating a massive-to-normally graded S3 layer. Subsequent reworking of the top of this new deposit by overlying remnant currents, or by new currents unrelated to the original flow, can create laminations that resemble the Bouma B layer. When reworking stops, suspension settling may deposit massive mudstone (Bouma E) directly on top of the laminated layer. Alternatively, if new sediment is introduced during this reworking phase, or if sediment is sufficiently remobilized and transported, then a more complete Bouma sequence may develop on top of the S3 layer.

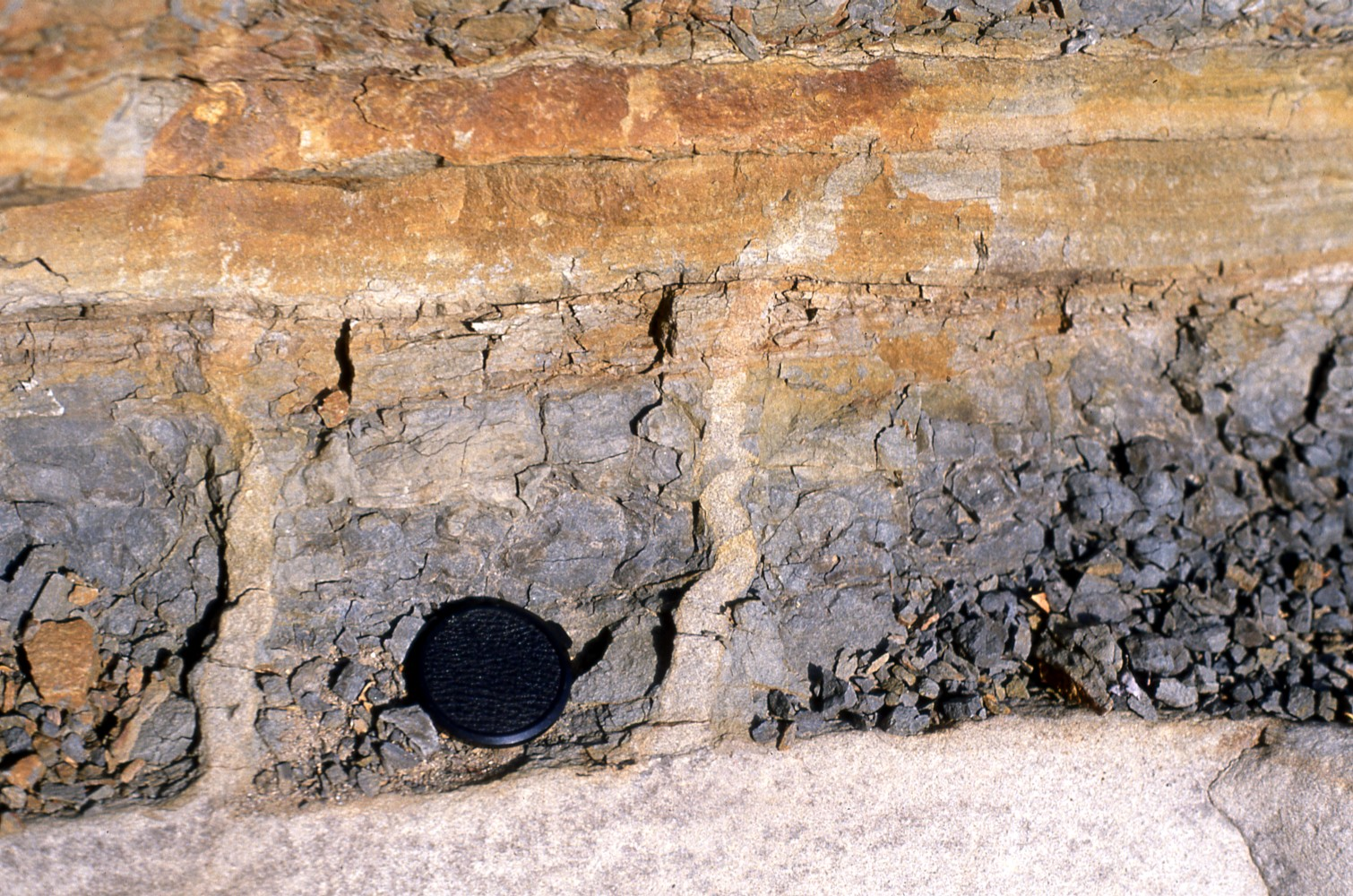
De-watering pipes above the Lowe S3 layer of a high-density turbidite. Cozy Dell Formation, California.

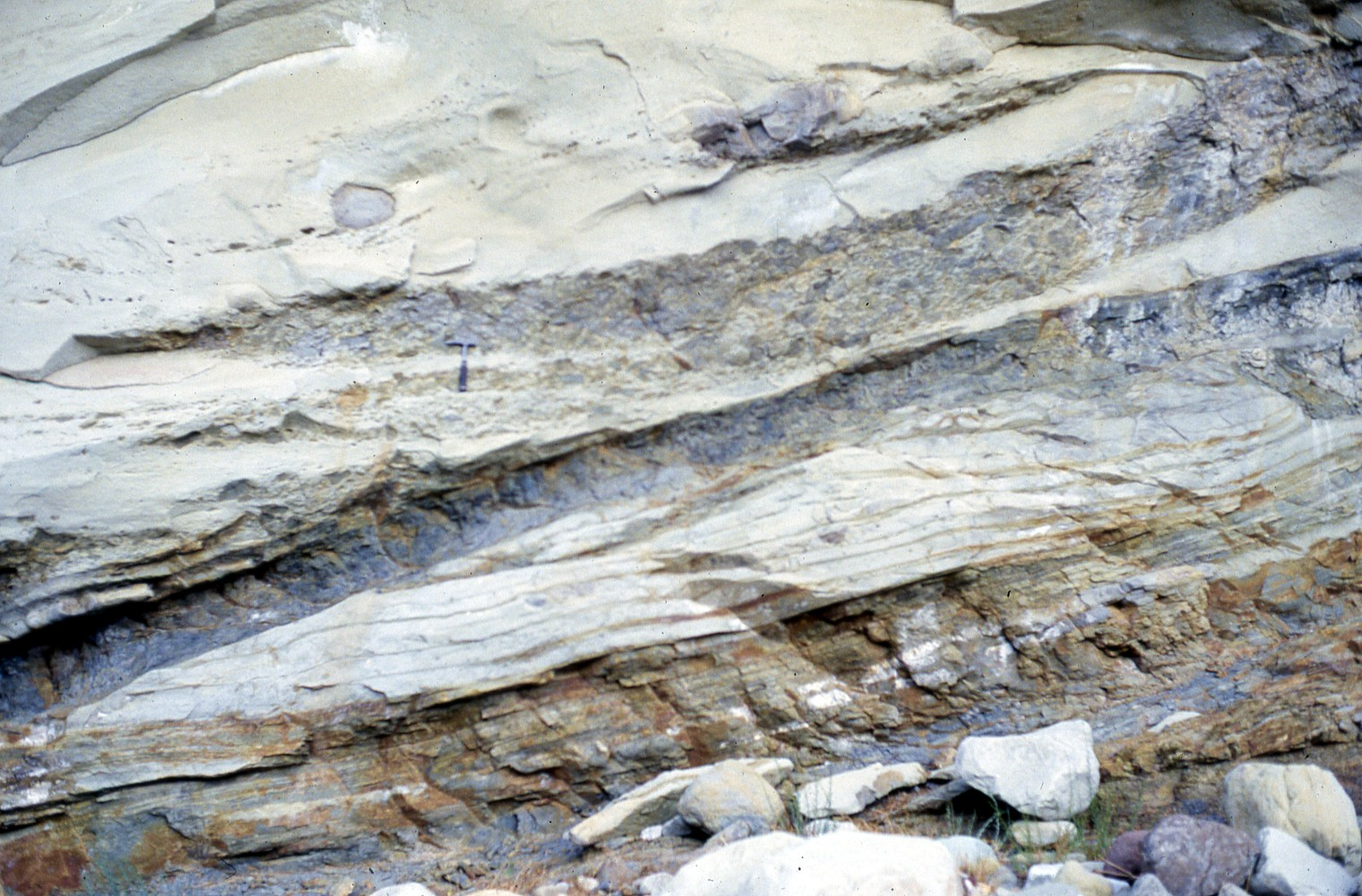
Giant shale rip-up clast in the Lowe S1 layer of a high-density turbidite. Cozy Dell Formation, California.

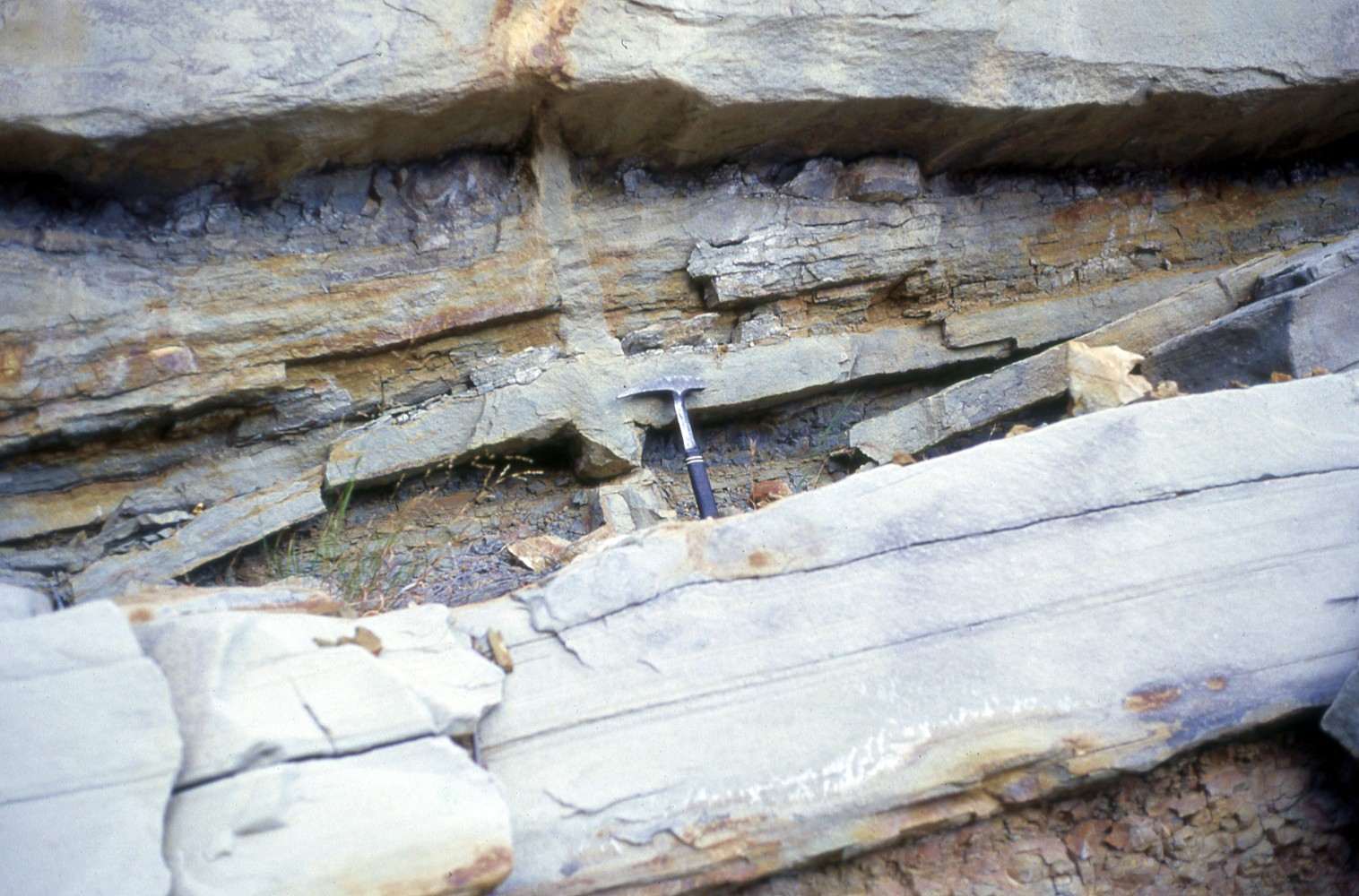
De-watering dike associated with a high-density turbidite. Cozy Dell Formation, California.

== See also ==
- Turbidites
- Turbidity currents
- Sediment gravity flows
- Bouma sequence
