= Turbidite =

Geologic deposit of a turbidity current

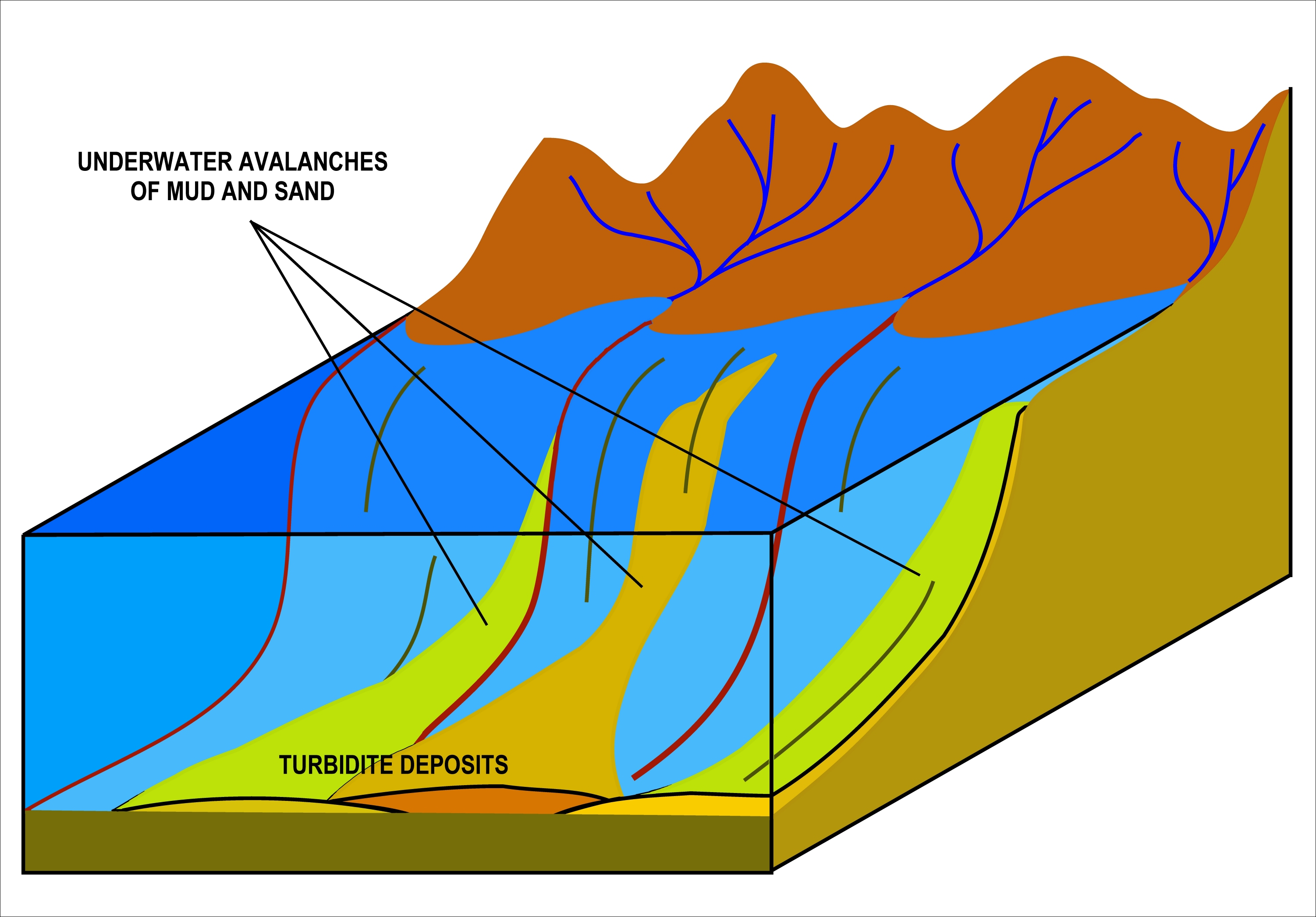
Turbidites are deposited in the deep ocean troughs below the continental shelf, or similar structures in deep lakes, by underwater avalanches which slide down the steep slopes of the continental shelf edge. When the material comes to rest in the ocean trough, it is the sand and other coarse material which settles first followed by mud and eventually the very fine particulate matter. It is this sequence of deposition that creates the Bouma sequences that characterize these rocks.

A turbidite is the geologic deposit of a turbidity current, which is a type of amalgamation of fluidal and sediment gravity flow responsible for distributing vast amounts of clastic sediment into the deep ocean.

== Sequencing ==
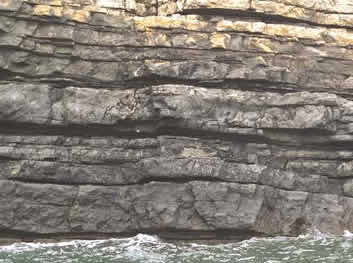
Turbidite sequence. Carboniferous Ross Sandstone Formation (Namurian), County Clare, Western Ireland (USGS image)

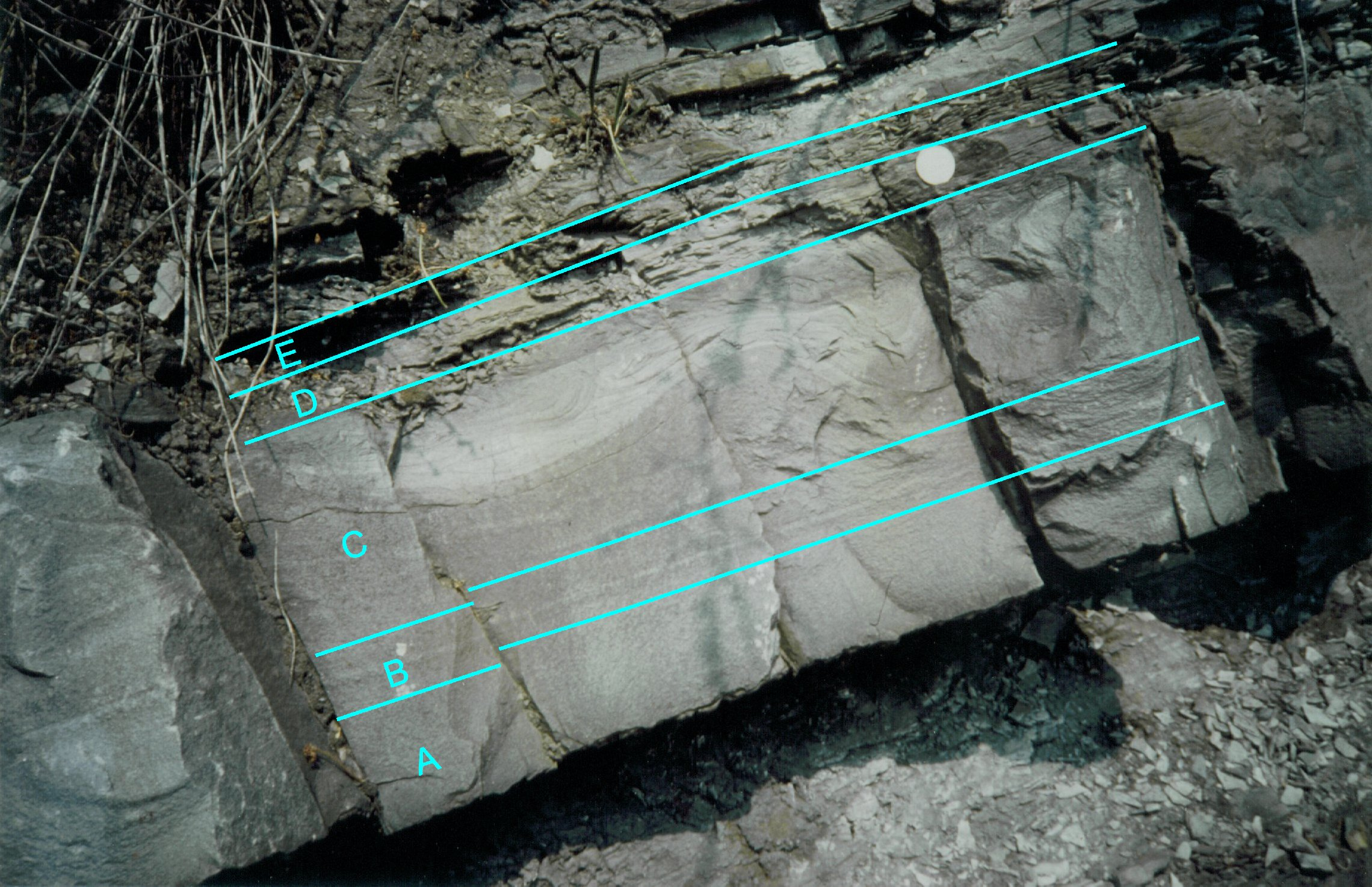
Complete Bouma sequence in Devonian Sandstone (Becke-Oese Quarry, Germany)

Turbidites were first properly described by Arnold H. Bouma (1962), who studied deepwater sediments and recognized particular "fining-up intervals" within deep water, fine-grained shales, which were anomalous because they started at pebble conglomerates and terminated in shales. This was anomalous because within the deep ocean it had historically been assumed that there was no mechanism by which tractional flow could carry and deposit coarse-grained sediments into the abyssal depths.

Bouma cycles begin with an erosional contact of a coarse lower bed of pebble to granule conglomerate in a sandy matrix, and grade up through coarse then medium plane parallel sandstone; through cross-bedded sandstone; rippled cross-bedded sand/silty sand, and finally laminar siltstone and shale. This vertical succession of sedimentary structures, bedding, and changing lithology is representative of strong to waning flow regime currents and their corresponding sedimentation.

It is unusual to see all of a complete Bouma cycle, as successive turbidity currents may erode the unconsolidated upper sequences. Alternatively, the entire sequence may not be present depending on whether the exposed section was at the edge of the turbidity current lobe (where it may be present as a thin deposit), or upslope from the deposition centre and manifested as a scour channel filled with fine sands grading up into a pelagic ooze.

It is now recognized that the vertical progression of sedimentary structures described by Bouma applies to turbidites deposited by low-density turbidity currents. As the sand concentration of a flow increases, grain-to-grain collisions within the turbid suspension create dispersive pressures that become important in hindering further settling of grains. As a consequence, a slightly different set of sedimentary structures develops in turbidites deposited by high-density turbidity currents. This different set of structures is known as the Lowe sequence, which is a descriptive classification that complements, but does not replace, the Bouma sequence.

== Formation ==
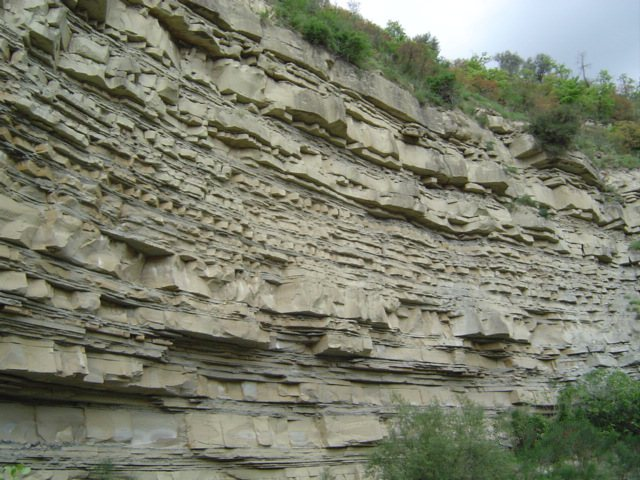
Gorgoglione Flysch, of Miocene age, South Italy

Turbidites are sediments which are transported and deposited by density flow, not by tractional or frictional flow.

The distinction is that, in a normal river or stream bed, particles of rock are carried along by frictional drag of water on the particle (known as tractional flow). The water must be travelling at a certain velocity in order to suspend the particle in the water and push it along. The greater the size or density of the particle relative to the fluid in which it is travelling, the higher the water velocity required to suspend it and transport it.

Density-based flow, however, occurs when liquefaction of sediment during transport causes a change to the density of the fluid. This is usually achieved by highly turbulent liquids which have a suspended load of fine grained particles forming a slurry. In this case, larger fragments of rock can be transported at water velocities too low to otherwise do so because of the lower density contrast (that is, the water plus sediment has a higher density than the water and is therefore closer to the density of the rock).

This condition occurs in many environments aside from simply the deep ocean, where turbidites are particularly well represented. Lahars on the side of volcanoes, mudslides and pyroclastic flows all create density-based flow situations and, especially in the latter, can create sequences which are strikingly similar to turbidites.

Turbidites in sediments can occur in carbonate as well as siliciclastic sequences.

Classic, low-density turbidites are characterized by graded bedding, current ripple marks, climbing ripple laminations, alternating sequences with pelagic sediments, distinct fauna changes between the turbidite and native pelagic sediments, sole markings, thick sediment sequences, regular bedding, and an absence of shallow-water features. A different vertical progression of sedimentary structures characterize high-density turbidites.

Massive accumulations of turbidites and other deep-water deposits may result in the formation of submarine fans. Sedimentary models of such fan systems typically are subdivided into upper, mid, and lower fan sequences each with distinct sand-body geometries, sediment distributions, and lithologic characteristics.

Turbidite deposits typically occur in foreland basins.

== Submarine fan models ==
Submarine fan models are often based on source-to-sink [S2S] concepts linking sediment source areas, and sediment routing systems to the eventual depositional environments of turbidite deposits. They are aimed at providing insights into the relationships between different geologic processes and turbidite fan systems. Geologic processes influencing turbidite systems can either be of allogenic or autogenic origin and submarine fan models are designed to capture the impact of these processes on reservoir presence, reservoir distribution, morphology, and architecture of turbidite deposits. Some significant allogenic forcing includes the effect of sea level fluctuations, regional tectonic events, sediment supply type, sediment supply rate, and sediment concentration. Autogenic controls can include seafloor topography, confinements, and slope gradients. There are about 26 submarine fan models. Some common fan models include the classical single-source suprafan model, models depicting fans with attached lobes, detached lobes fan model, and submarine fan models relating to the response of turbidite systems to varying grain sizes and different feeder systems. The integration of subsurface datasets such as 3D/4D seismic reflection, well logs, and core data as well as modern seafloor bathymetry studies, numerical forward stratigraphic modeling, and flume tank experiments are enabling improvements and more realistic development of submarine fan models across different basins.

== Importance ==
Turbidites provide a mechanism for assigning a tectonic and depositional setting to ancient sedimentary sequences as they usually represent deep-water rocks formed offshore of a convergent margin, and generally require at least a sloping shelf and some form of tectonism to trigger density-based avalanches. Density currents may be triggered in areas of high sediment supply by gravitational failure alone. Turbidites can represent a high resolution record of seismicity, and terrestrial storm/flood events depending on the connectivity of canyon/channel systems to terrestrial sediment sources.

Turbidites from lakes and fjords are also important as they can provide chronologic evidence of the frequency of landslides and the earthquakes that presumably formed them, by dating using radiocarbon or varves above and below the turbidite.

== Economic importance ==
Turbidite sequences are classic hosts for lode gold deposits, the prime example being Bendigo and Ballarat in Victoria, Australia, where more than 2,600 tons of gold have been extracted from saddle-reef deposits hosted in shale sequences from a thick succession of Cambrian-Ordovician turbidites. Proterozoic gold deposits are also known from turbidite basin deposits.

Lithified accumulations of turbidite deposits may, in time, become hydrocarbon reservoirs and the petroleum industry makes strenuous efforts to predict the location, overall shape, and internal characteristics of these sediment bodies in order to efficiently develop fields as well as explore for new reserves.

== See also ==
- Bouma sequence
- Contourite
- Flysch
- High-density turbidity currents (Lowe sequence)
- Sediment gravity flows
- Tempestite
