= Powder snow avalanche =

Type of avalanche

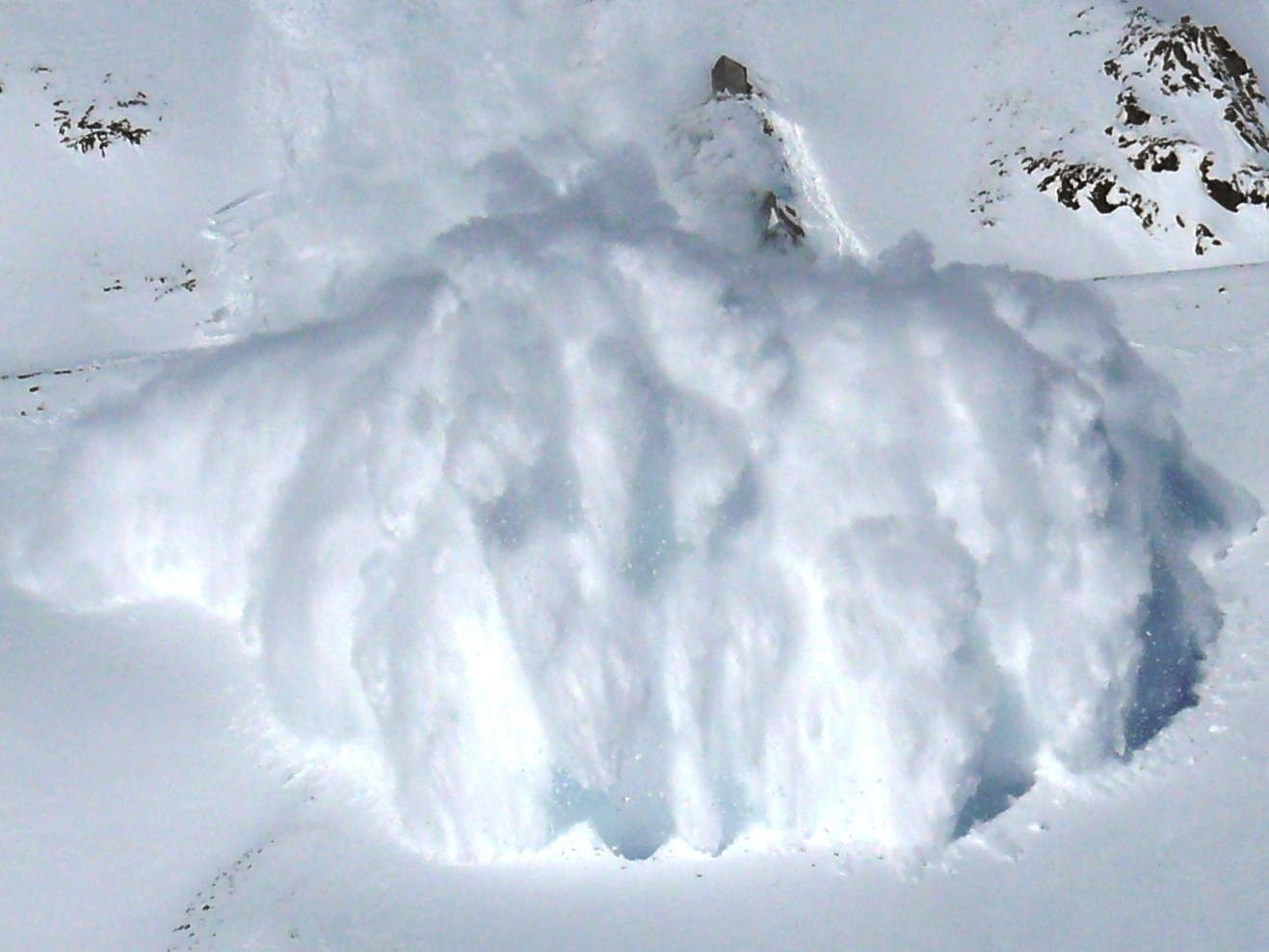
Example of powder snow avalanche

Avalanche on the northern slopes of Pobeda Peak

A powder snow avalanche is a type of avalanche where snow grains are largely or completely suspended and moved by air in a state of fluid turbulence.

They are particle-laden gravity currents and closely related to turbidity currents, pyroclastic flows from volcanoes and dust storms in the desert.

The turbulence is typically generated by the forward motion of the current along the lower boundary of the domain, the motion being in turn driven by the action of gravity on the density difference between the particle-fluid mixture and the ambient fluid. The ambient fluid is generally of similar composition to (and miscible with) the interstitial fluid, and is water for turbidity currents and air for avalanches. These flows are non-conservative in that they may exchange particles at the lower boundary by deposition or suspension, and may exchange fluid with the ambient by entrainment or detrainment. Such flows dissipate when the turbulence can no longer hold the particles in suspension and they are deposited on the lower boundary.

When the turbulence is strong enough to suspend new material from the bed or the underlying dense flow then current is said to be auto-suspending. Particle concentrations in the suspension cloud are usually sufficiently low (0.1-7% by volume) that particle-particle interactions play a small or negligible role in maintaining the suspension. In powder snow avalanches, even at these low concentrations, the extra density of the suspended particles is large relative to that of air, so the Boussinesq approximation, where density differences are considered negligible in inertia terms, is invalid, so that the snow grains carry most of the flows momentum. This is in contrast to turbidity currents and laboratory experiments in water where the extra inertia of the particles can usually be neglected. Nonetheless, due to the extreme difficulty in estimating particle concentrations in natural flows there remains considerable uncertainty—and debate—concerning the particle loading in large submarine turbidity currents and the validity of the Boussinesq approximation.
