= Traction (geology) =

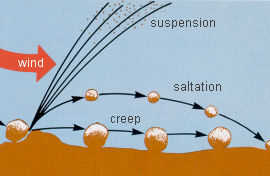

Traction is the geologic process whereby a current transports larger, heavier rocks by rolling or sliding them along the bottom. Thus, the grains and clasts interact with the substratum during transport. By contrast, saltation, a related sediment transport process, moves grains across the bottom by bouncing or hopping. The actual current carries the sediment load in traction and saltation flows, whereas downslope movement under the force of gravity carries the sediment in gravity flows. These processes contrast with suspension settling, in which there is no current. Traction is where large stones or boulders in the river's load are rolled along by the force of the river.
