= Graded bedding =

Type of layering in sediment or sedimentary rock

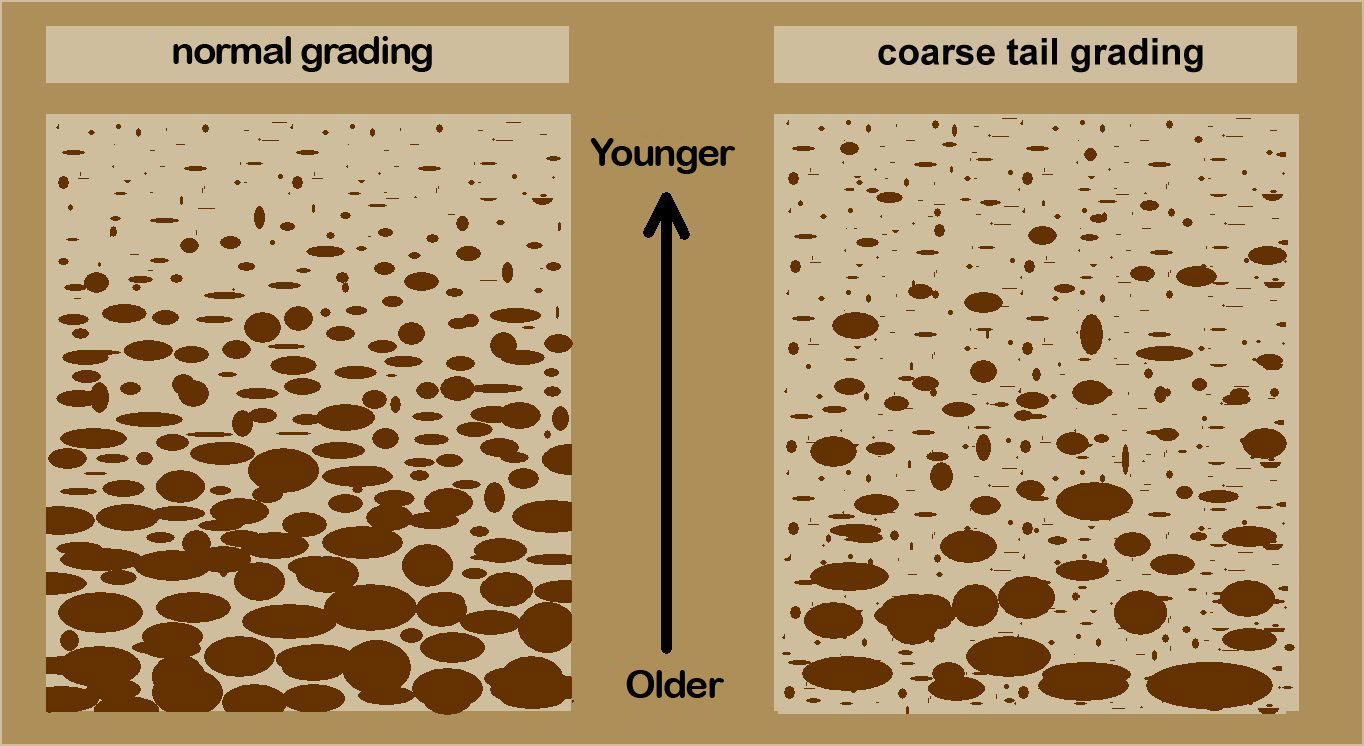
Schematic illustrations of two styles of graded bedding: left: normal grading; right: coarse tail grading.

In geology, a graded bed is a bed characterized by a systematic change in grain or clast size from bottom to top of the bed. Most commonly this takes the form of normal grading, with coarser sediments at the base, which grade upward into progressively finer ones. Such a bed is also described as fining upward. Normally graded beds generally represent depositional environments which decrease in transport energy (rate of flow) as time passes, but these beds can also form during rapid depositional events. They are perhaps best represented in turbidite strata, where they indicate a sudden strong current that deposits heavy, coarse sediments first, with finer ones following as the current weakens. They can also form in terrestrial stream deposits.

In reverse grading or inverse grading the bed coarsens upwards. This type of grading is relatively uncommon but is characteristic of sediments deposited by grain flow and debris flow. A favored explanation for reverse grading in these processes is kinetic sieving. It is also observed in aeolian processes, such as in pyroclastic fall deposits. These deposition processes are examples of granular convection.

== Graded bedding ==
Graded bedding is a sorting of particles according to clast size and shape on a lithified horizontal plane. The term is an explanation as to how a geologic profile was formed. Stratification on a lateral plane is the physical result of active depositing of different size materials. Density and gravity forces in the downward movement of these materials in a confined system result in a separating of the detritus settling with respect to size. Thus, finer, higher-porosity clasts form at the top and denser, less porous clasts are consolidated on the bottom, in what is called normal grading. (Inversely graded beds are composed of large clasts on the top, with smaller clasts on the bottom.) Grades of the bedding material are determined by precipitation of solid components compared to the viscosity of the medium in which the particles precipitate. Steno's Principle of Original Horizontality explains that rock layers form in horizontal layers over an underdetermined time scale and depth. Nicholas Steno first published his hypothesis in 1669 after recognizing that fossils were preserved in layers of rock (strata).

== Formation ==
For materials to settle in stratified layers the defining quality is periodicity. There must be repeated depositional events with changes in precipitation of materials over time. The thickness of graded beds ranges from 1 millimeter to multiple meters. There is no set time limit in which the layers are formed. Uniformity of size and shape of materials within the bed form must be present on a present or previously horizontal plane.

== Necessary conditions ==
- Weathering: the chemical or physical forces breaking apart the solid materials that are potentially transported.
- Erosion: The movement of material due to weathering forces that have freed materials for movement.
- Deposition: The material settles on a horizontal plane either through chemical or physical precipitation.

Note: The secondary processes of compaction, cementation, and lithification help to hold a stratified bed in place.

== Origins ==
=== Sedimentary graded bedding ===
In aeolian or fluid depositional environments, where there is a decrease in transport energy over time, the bedding material is sorted more uniformly, according to the normal grading scale. As water or air slows, the turbidity decreases. The suspended load of the detritus then precipitates. In times of fast movement the bedding may be poorly sorted on the deposition surface and thus is not normally graded because of the quick movement of the material. In broad channels with decreasing slopes, slow-moving water can carry large amounts of detritus over a large area. Thus, graded beds form at points with decreased slopes in wide areas with less bounding of energy current flows. The energy is dispersed and decreases. Turbid sediments precipitate in concordant sizes and shapes in layers.

Changes in currents or physical deformation in the environment can be determined upon observation and monitoring of a depositional surface or lithologic sequence with unconformities above or below a graded bed. Detrital sedimentary graded beds are formed from erosional, depositional, and weathering forces. Graded beds formed from detrital materials are generally composed of sand, and clay. After lithification, shale, siltstone, and sandstone are formed from the detrital deposits.

=== Bioclastic graded bedding ===
Bioclastic formations are of organic sources, such as biochemical chert, which forms from siliceous marine organism decay and diagenesis. Organic sedimentation of parent material from decaying plant matter in bogs or swamps can also result in a graded bedding complex. This activity leads to formation of peat or coal, after thousands of years. Limestone is more than 95% biogenic in origin. It is made from the deposition of carbonate fossils of marine organisms. Bio erosion caused by animals, such as bivalves, shrimp and sponges change the marine substrate, resulting in layered bedding planes, due to their sifting of bed material in search of food. Organic clastic bedding can become shale and oil shale or millions of years under pressure.

== See also ==
- Clastic rock
