= Back-arc basin =

Submarine features associated with island arcs and subduction zones

Cross-section through the shallow part of a subduction zone showing the relative positions of an active magmatic arc and back-arc basin, such as the southern part of the Izu–Bonin–Mariana Arc.

A back-arc basin is a type of geologic basin, found at some convergent plate boundaries. Presently all back-arc basins are submarine features associated with island arcs and subduction zones, with many found in the western Pacific Ocean. Most of them result from tensional forces, caused by a process known as oceanic trench rollback, where a subduction zone moves towards the subducting plate. Back-arc basins were initially an unexpected phenomenon in plate tectonics, as convergent boundaries were expected to universally be zones of compression. However, in 1970, Dan Karig published a model of back-arc basins consistent with plate tectonics.

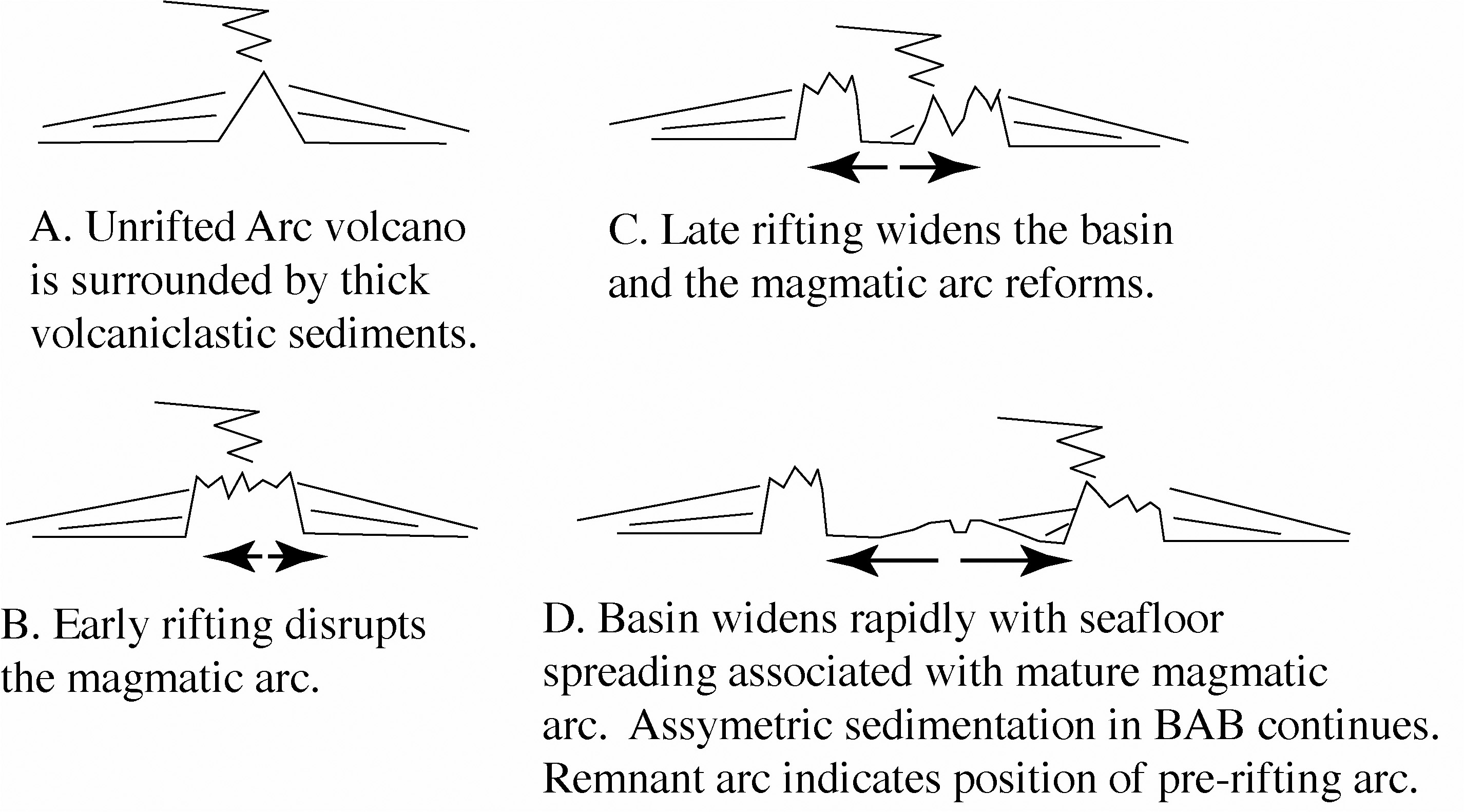
Cross-section sketch showing the development of a back-arc basin by rifting the arc longitudinally. The rift matures to the point of seafloor spreading, allowing a new magmatic arc to form on the trenchward side of the basin (to the right in this image) and stranding a remnant arc on the far side of the basin (to the left in this image).

== Structural characteristics ==
Back-arc basins are typically very long and relatively narrow, often thousands of kilometers long while only being a few hundred kilometers wide at most. For back-arc extension to form, a subduction zone is required, but not all subduction zones have a back-arc extension feature. Back-arc basins are found in areas where the subducting plate of oceanic crust is very old. The restricted width of back-arc basins is due to magmatic activity being reliant on water and induced mantle convection, limiting their formation to along subduction zones. Spreading rates vary from only a few centimeters per year (as in the Mariana Trough), to 15 cm/year in the Lau Basin. Spreading ridges within the basins erupt basalts that are similar to those erupted from the mid-ocean ridges; the main difference being back-arc basin basalts are often very rich in magmatic water (typically 1–1.5 weight % H_{2}O), whereas mid-ocean ridge basalt magmas are very dry (typically <0.3 weight % H_{2}O). The high water contents of back-arc basin basalt magmas is derived from water carried down the subduction zone and released into the overlying mantle wedge. Additional sources of water could be the eclogitization of amphiboles and micas in the subducting slab. Similar to mid-ocean ridges, back-arc basins have hydrothermal vents and associated chemosynthetic communities.

== Seafloor spreading ==
Evidence of seafloor spreading has been seen in cores of the basin floor. The thickness of sediment that collected in the basin decreased toward the center of the basin, indicating a younger surface. The idea that thickness and age of sediment on the sea floor is related to the age of the oceanic crust was proposed by Harry Hess. Magnetic anomalies of the crust that had formed in back-arc basins deviated in form from the crust formed at mid-ocean ridges. In many areas the anomalies do not appear parallel, as well as the profiles of the magnetic anomalies in the basin lacking symmetry or a central anomaly as a traditional ocean basin does, indicating asymmetric seafloor spreading.

This has prompted some to characterize the spreading in back-arc basins to be more diffused and less uniform than at mid-ocean ridges. The idea that back-arc basin spreading is inherently different from mid-ocean ridge spreading is controversial and has been debated through the years. Another argument put forward is that the process of seafloor spreading is the same in both cases, but the movement of seafloor spreading centers in the basin causes the asymmetry in the magnetic anomalies. This process can be seen in the Lau back-arc basin. Though the magnetic anomalies are more complex to decipher, the rocks sampled from back-arc basin spreading centers do not differ very much from those at mid-ocean ridges. In contrast, the volcanic rocks of the nearby island arc differ significantly from those in the basin.

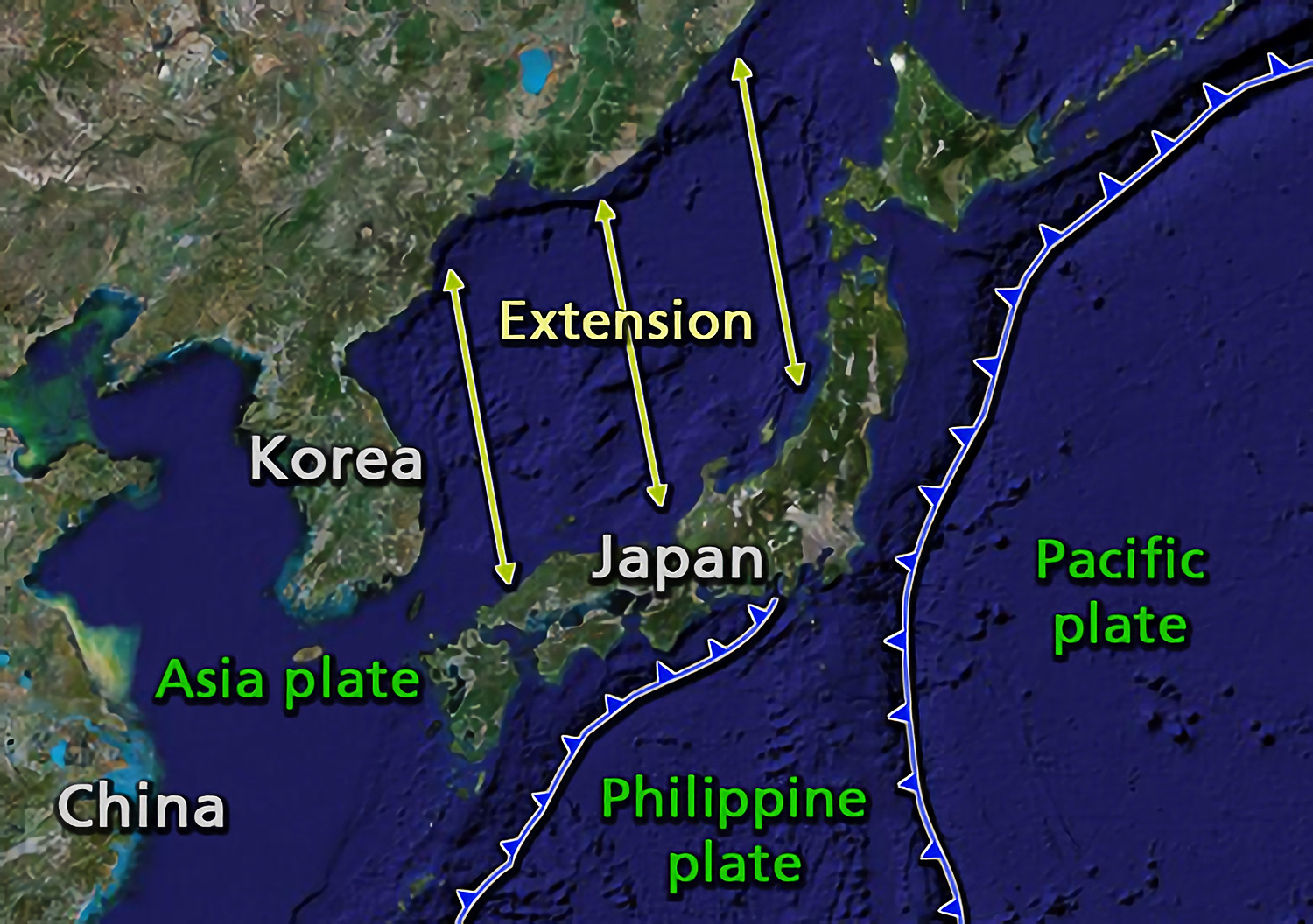
The islands of Japan were separated from mainland Asia by back-arc spreading.

Back-arc basins are different from normal mid-ocean ridges because they are characterized by asymmetric seafloor spreading, but this is quite variable even within single basins. For example, in the central Mariana Trough, current spreading rates are 2–3 times greater on the western flank, whereas at the southern end of the Mariana Trough the position of the spreading center adjacent to the volcanic front suggests that overall crustal accretion has been nearly entirely asymmetric there. This situation is mirrored to the north where a large spreading asymmetry is also developed.

Other back-arc basins such as the Lau Basin have undergone large rift jumps and propagation events (sudden changes in relative rift motion) that have transferred spreading centers from arc-distal to more arc-proximal positions. Conversely, study of recent spreading rates appear to be relatively symmetric with perhaps small rift jumps. The cause of asymmetric spreading in back-arc basins remains poorly understood. General ideas invoke asymmetries relative to the spreading axis in arc melt generation processes and heat flow, hydration gradients with distance from the slab, mantle wedge effects, and evolution from rifting to spreading.

== Formation and tectonics ==
The extension of the crust behind volcanic arcs is believed to be caused by processes in association with subduction. As the subducting plate descends into the asthenosphere it sheds water, causing mantle melting, volcanism, and the formation of island arcs. Another result of this is a convection cell is formed. The rising magma and heat along with the outwards tension in the crust in contact with the convection cell cause a region of melt to form, resulting in a rift. This process drives the island arc toward the subduction zone and the rest of the plate away from the subduction zone. The backward motion of the subduction zone relative to the motion of the plate which is being subducted is called trench rollback (also known as hinge rollback or hinge retreat). As the subduction zone and its associated trench pull backward, the overriding plate is stretched, thinning the crust and forming a back-arc basin. In some cases, extension is triggered by the entrance of a buoyant feature in the subduction zone, which locally slows down subduction and induces the subducting plate to rotate adjacent to it. This rotation is associated with trench retreat and overriding plate extension.

The age of the subducting crust needed to establish back-arc spreading has been found to be 55 million years old or older. This is why back-arc spreading centers appear concentrated in the western Pacific. The dip angle of the subducting slab may also be significant, as is shown to be greater than 30° in areas of back-arc spreading; this is most likely because as oceanic crust gets older it becomes denser, resulting in a steeper angle of descent.

The thinning of the overriding plate from back-arc rifting can lead to the formation of new oceanic crust (i.e., back-arc spreading). As the lithosphere stretches, the asthenosphere below rises to shallow depths and partially melts as a result of adiabatic decompression melting. As this melt nears the surface, spreading begins.

== Sedimentation ==
Sedimentation is strongly asymmetric, with most of the sediment supplied from the active volcanic arc which regresses in step with the rollback of the trench. From cores collected during the Deep Sea Drilling Project (DSDP) nine sediment types were found in the back-arc basins of the western Pacific. Debris flows of thick to medium bedded massive conglomerates account for 1.2% of sediments collected by the DSDP. The average size of the sediments in the conglomerates are pebble sized but can range from granules to cobbles. Accessory materials include limestone fragments, chert, shallow water fossils and sandstone clasts.

Submarine fan systems of interbedded turbidite sandstone and mudstone made up 20% of the total thickness of sediment recovered by the DSDP. The fans can be divided into two sub-systems based on the differences in lithology, texture, sedimentary structures, and bedding style. These systems are inner and midfan subsystem and the outer fan subsystem. The inner and midfan system contains interbedded thin to medium bedded sandstones and mudstones. Structures that are found in these sandstones include load clasts, micro-faults, slump folds, convolute laminations, dewatering structures, graded bedding, and gradational tops of sandstone beds. Partial Bouma sequences can be found within the subsystem. The outer fan subsystem generally consists of finer sediments when compared to the inner and midfan system. Well sorted volcanoclastic sandstones, siltstones and mudstones are found in this system. Sedimentary structures found in this system include parallel laminae, micro-cross laminae, and graded bedding. Partial Bouma sequences can be identified in this subsystem.

Pelagic clays containing iron-manganese micronodules, quartz, plagioclase, orthoclase, magnetite, volcanic glass, montmorillonite, illite, smectite, foraminiferal remains, diatoms, and sponge spicules made up the uppermost stratigraphic section at each site it was found. This sediment type consisted of 4.2% of the total thickness of sediment recovered by the DSDP.

Biogenic pelagic silica sediments consist of radiolarian, diatomaceous, silicoflagellate oozes, and chert. It makes up 4.3% of the sediment thickness recovered. Biogenic pelagic carbonates is the most common sediment type recovered from the back-arc basins of the western Pacific. This sediment type made up 23.8% of the total thickness of sediment recovered by the DSDP. The pelagic carbonates consist of ooze, chalk, and limestone. Nanofossils and foraminifera make up the majority of the sediment. Resedimented carbonates made up 9.5% of the total thickness of sediment recovered by the DSDP. This sediment type had the same composition as the biogenic pelagic carbonated, but it had been reworked with well-developed sedimentary structures. Pyroclastics consisting of volcanic ash, tuff and a host of other constituents including nanofossils, pyrite, quartz, plant debris, and glass made up 9.5% of the sediment recovered. These volcanic sediments were sourced from the regional tectonic controlled volcanism and the nearby island arc sources.

== Locations ==
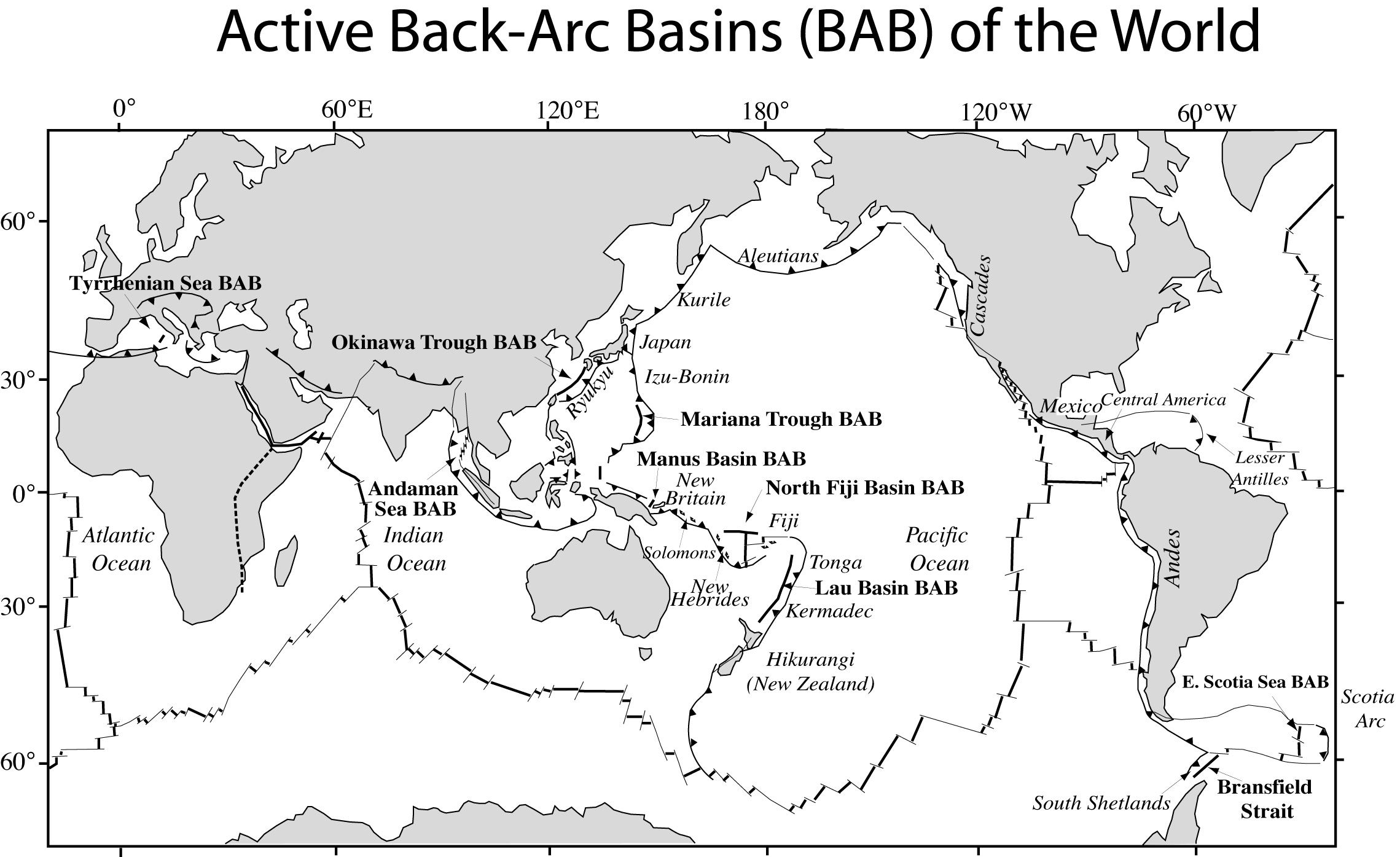
The active back-arc basins of the world

Active back-arc basins are found in the Marianas, Kermadec-Tonga, South Scotia, Manus, North Fiji, and Tyrrhenian Sea regions, but most are found in the western Pacific. Not all subduction zones have back-arc basins; some, like the central Andes, are associated with rear-arc compression.

There are a number of extinct or fossil back-arc basins, such as the Parece Vela-Shikoku Basin, Sea of Japan, and Kurile Basin. Compressional back-arc basins are found, for example, in the Pyrenees and the Swiss Alps.

== History of thought ==
With the development of plate tectonic theory, geologists thought that convergent plate margins were zones of compression, thus zones of strong extension above subduction zones (back-arc basins) were not expected. The hypothesis that some convergent plate margins were actively spreading was developed by Dan Karig in 1970, while a graduate student at the Scripps Institution of Oceanography. This was the result of several marine geologic expeditions to the western Pacific.

== See also ==
- Back-arc region
- Forearc basin
- Intra-arc basin

== General and cited references ==
- Barker, P.F.; Hill, I.A. (1980). "Asymmetric spreading in back-arc basins". Nature. 285 (5767): 652–654. Bibcode:1980Natur.285..652B. doi:10.1038/285652a0. S2CID 4233630.
- Deschamps, A.; Fujiwara, T. (2003). "Asymmetric accretion along the slow-spreading Mariana Ridge". Geochem. Geophys. Geosyst. 4 (10): 8622. Bibcode:2003GGG.....4.8622D. doi:10.1029/2003GC000537.
- Forsyth, D.; Uyeda, S. (1975). "On the Relative Importance of the Driving Forces of Plate Motion*". Geophysical Journal International. 43 (1): 163–200. Bibcode:1975GeoJ...43..163F. doi:10.1111/j.1365-246x.1975.tb00631.x.
- Gill, J.B. (1976). "Composition and age of Lau Basin and Ridge volcanic rocks: Implications for evolution of an interarc basin and remnant arc". GSA Bulletin. 87 (10): 1384–1395. Bibcode:1976GSAB...87.1384G. doi:10.1130/0016-7606(1976)87<1384:caaolb>2.0.co;2.
- Hess, Henry H. (1962). "History of Ocean Basins". Petrological Studies: A Volume to Honor A .F. Buddington. 599–620. OCLC 881288.
- Karig, Daniel E (1970). "Ridges and basins of the Tonga-Kermadec island arc system". Journal of Geophysical Research. 75 (2): 239–254. Bibcode:1970JGR....75..239K. doi:10.1029/JB075i002p00239.
- Klein, G.D. (1985). "The Control of Depositional Depth, Tectonic Uplift, and Volcanism on Sedimentation Processes in the Back-Arc Basins of the Western Pacific Ocean". Journal of Geology. 93 (1): 1–25. Bibcode:1985JG.....93....1D. doi:10.1086/628916. S2CID 129527339.
- Martinez, F.; Fryer, P.; Baker, N.A.; Yamazaki, T. (1995). "Evolution of backarc rifting: Mariana Trough, 20–24N". J. Geophys. Res. 100 (B3): 3807–3827. Bibcode:1995JGR...100.3807M. doi:10.1029/94JB02466.
- Martinez, F.; Fryer, P.; Becker, N. (2000). "Geophysical Characteristics of the Southern Mariana Trough, 11N–13N". J. Geophys. Res. 105 (B7): 16591–16607. Bibcode:2000JGR...10516591M. doi:10.1029/2000JB900117.
- Molnar, P.; Atwater, T. (1978). "Interarc spreading and Cordilleran tectonics as alternates related to the age of subducted oceanic lithosphere". Earth Planet. Sci. Lett. 41 (3): 330–340. Bibcode:1978E&PSL..41..330M. doi:10.1016/0012-821X(78)90187-5.
- Parson, L.M.; Pearce, J.A.; Murton, B.J.; Hodkinson, R.A. (1990). "Role of ridge jumps and ridge propagation in the tectonic evolution of the Lau back-arc basin, southwest Pacific". Geology. 18 (5): 470–473. Bibcode:1990Geo....18..470P. doi:10.1130/0091-7613(1990)018<0470:RORJAR>2.3.CO;2.
- Sdrolias, M.; Muller, R.D. (2006). "Controls on back-arc basin formations". Geochemistry, Geophysics, Geosystems. 7 (4): 1–40. Bibcode:2006GGG.....7.4016S. doi:10.1029/2005GC001090. S2CID 129068818.
- Taylor, Brian (1995). Backarc Basins: Tectonics and Magmatism. New York: Plenum Press. ISBN 9780306449376. OCLC 32464941.
- Taylor, B.; Zellmer, K.; Martinez, F.; Goodliffe, A. (1996). "Sea-floor spreading in the Lau back-arc basin". Earth and Planetary Science Letters. 144 (1–2): 35–40. Bibcode:1996E&PSL.144...35T. doi:10.1016/0012-821x(96)00148-3.
- Uyeda S (1984). "Subduction zones: their diversity, mechanism and human impact". GeoJournal. 8 (1): 381–406. Bibcode:1984GeoJo...8..381U. doi:10.1007/BF00185938. S2CID 128986436.
- Wallace, Laura M.; Ellis, Susan; Mann, Paul (2009). "Collisional model for rapid fore-arc block rotations, arc curvature, and episodic back-arc rifting in subduction settings". Geochemistry, Geophysics, Geosystems. 10 (5): n/a. Bibcode:2009GGG....10.5001W. doi:10.1029/2008gc002220.
- Yamazaki, T.; Seama, N.; Okino, K.; Kitada, K.; Joshima, M.; Oda, H.; Naka, J. (2003). "Spreading process of the northern Mariana Trough: Rifting-spreading transition at 22 N". Geochem. Geophys. Geosyst. 4 (9): 1075. Bibcode:2003GGG.....4.1075Y. doi:10.1029/2002GC000492.
- Zellmer, K.E.; Taylor, B. (2001). "A three-plate kinematic model for Lau Basin opening". Geochem. Geophys. Geosyst. 2 (5): 1020. Bibcode:2001GGG.....2.1020Z. doi:10.1029/2000GC000106.
