= Way up structure =

A way up structure, way up criterion, or geopetal indicator is a characteristic relationship observed in a sedimentary or volcanic rock, or sequence of rocks, that makes it possible to determine whether they are the right way up (i.e. in the attitude in which they were originally deposited, also known as "stratigraphic up" or "younging upwards") or have been overturned by subsequent deformation. This technique is particularly important in areas affected by thrusting and where there is a lack of other indications of the relative ages of beds within the sequence, such as in the Precambrian where fossils are rare.

The original definition comes from Bruno Sander in 1936, translated from German to English in 1951, which states:

Geopetal Fabrics - All the widely distributed spatial characters of a fabric that enable us to determine what was the relation of "top" to "bottom" at the time when the rock was formed are termed geopetal fabrics. Such fabrics are mechanical and chemical internal deposition; grains on a boundary surface; cross-bedding, etc.

== Examples ==
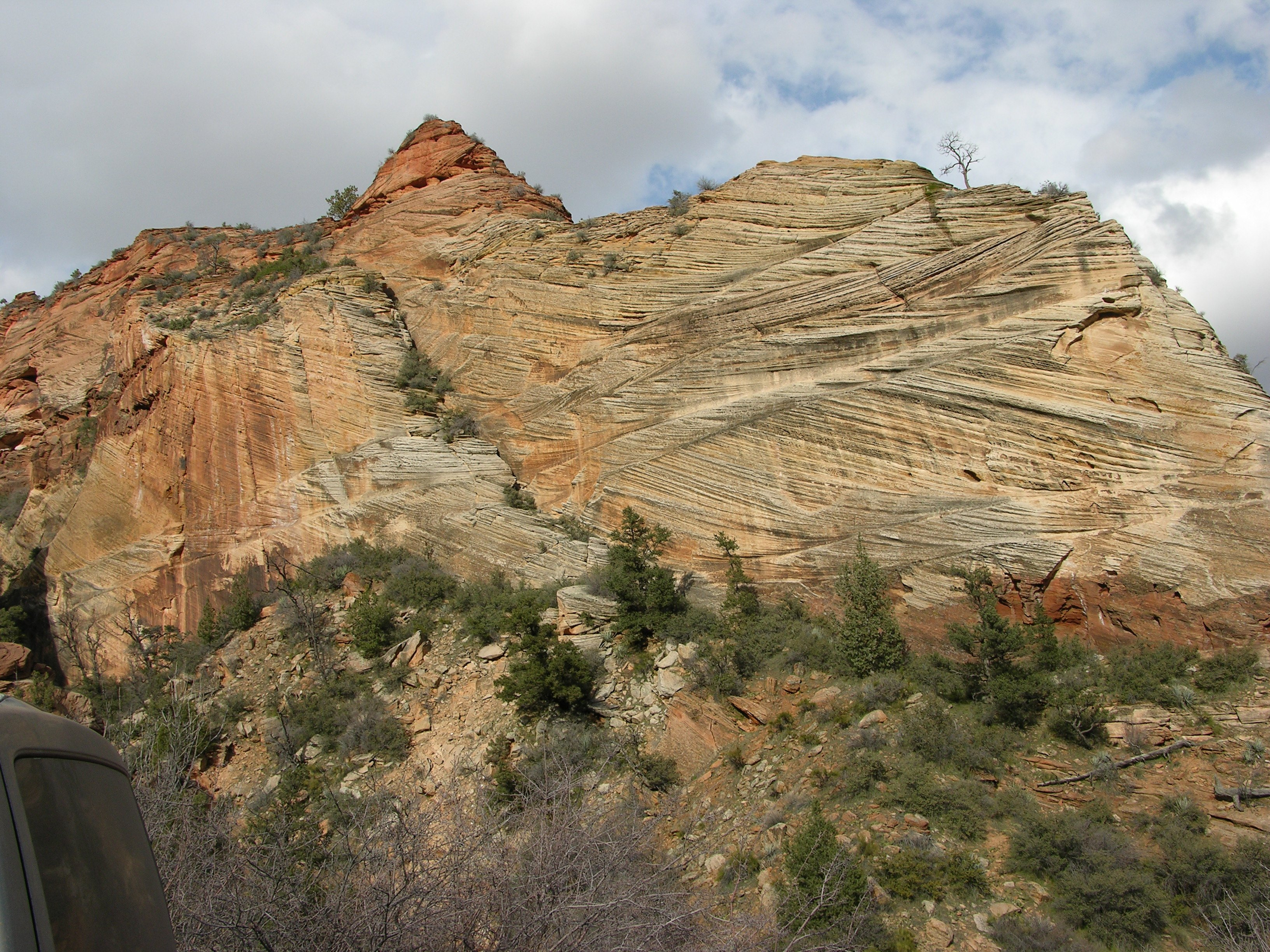
Cross-bedding in Zion National Park, Utah. Both the tangential bases on the cross beds and the truncations of overlying layers can be used as a way up indicator.

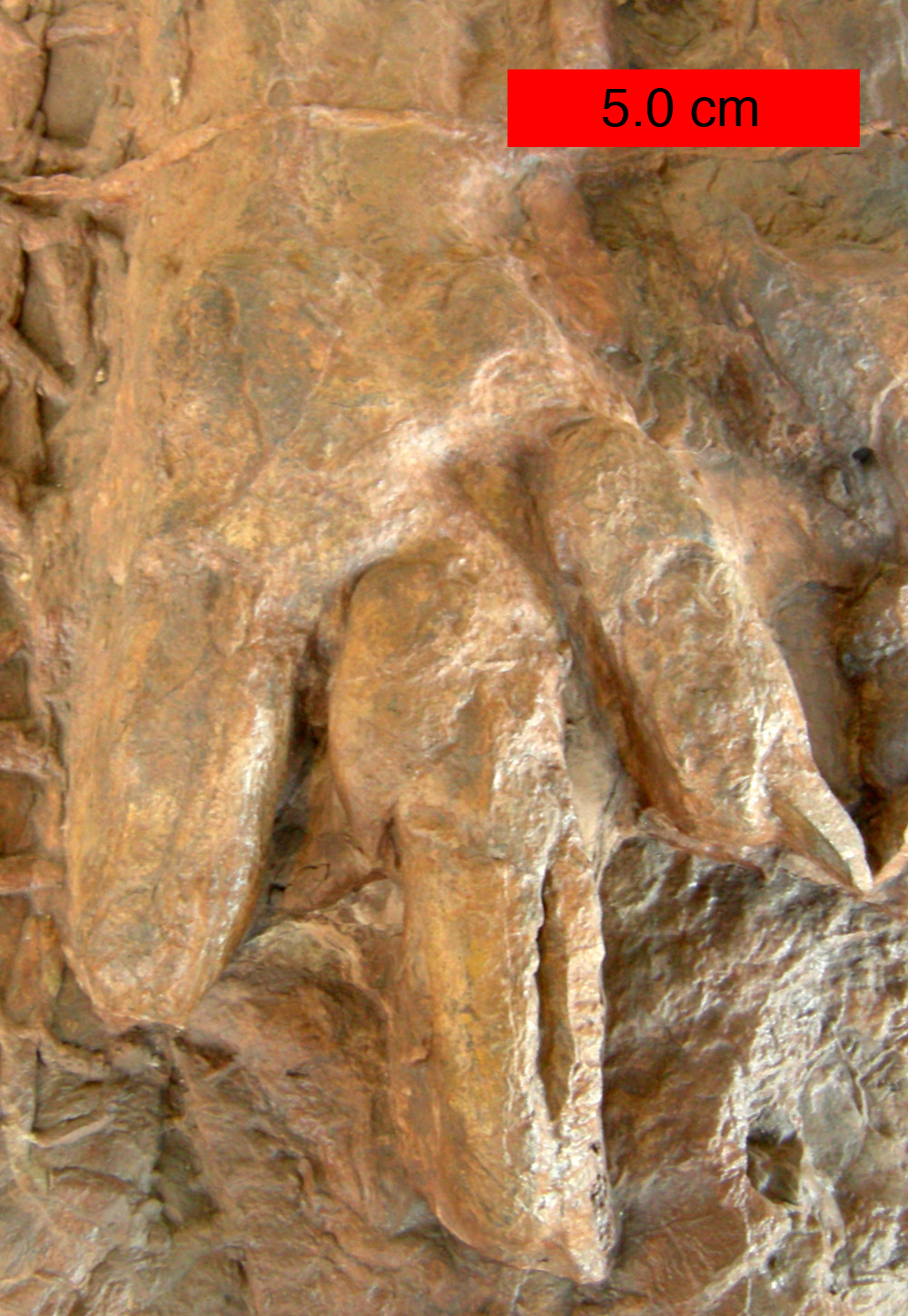
A dinosaur footprint preserved in positive relief is a trace fossil indicating the bottom (or sole) of the bed (Lower Jurassic Moenave Formation, southwestern Utah).

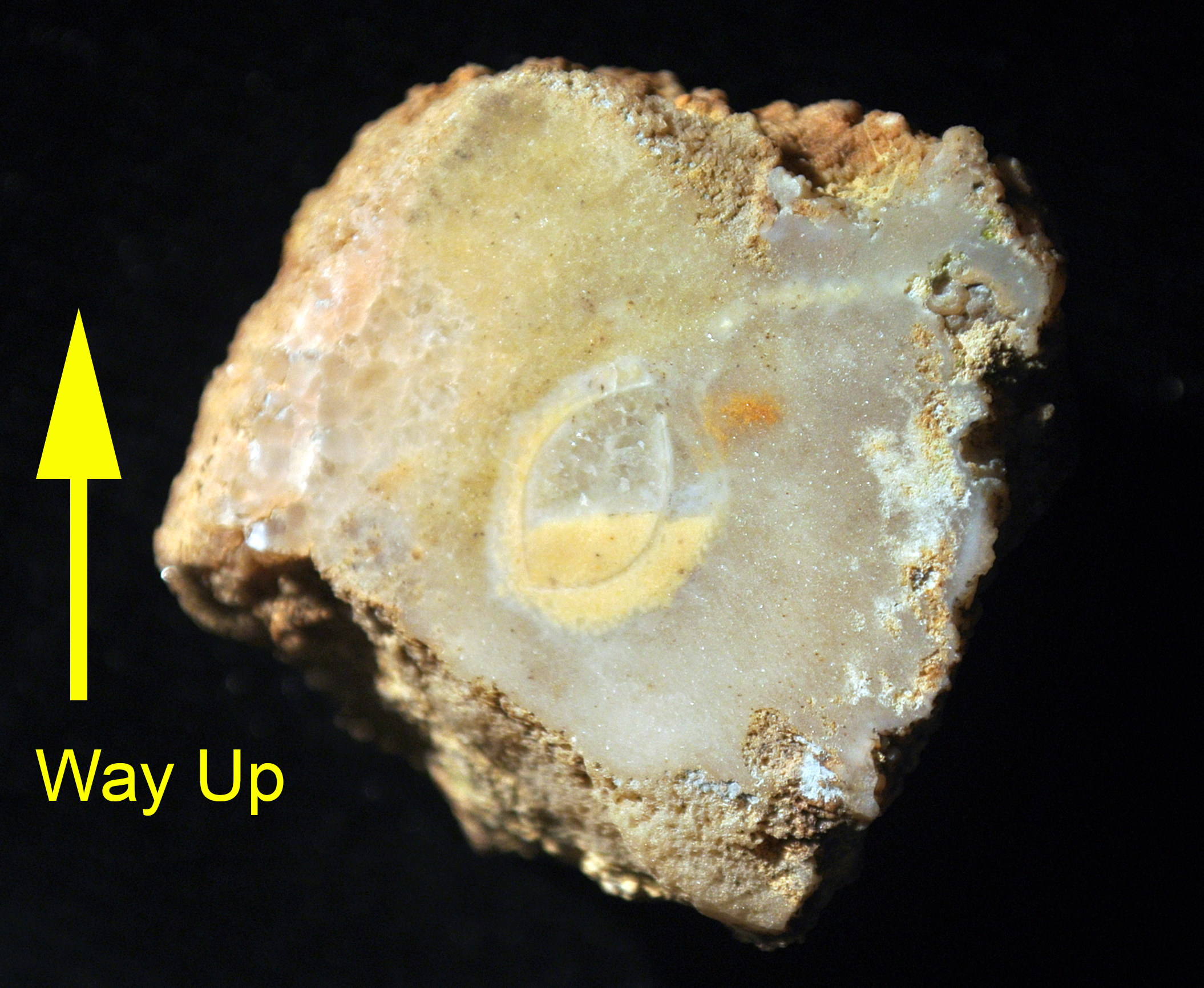
Geopetal structure in bivalve boring in coral; bivalve shell visible; Matmor Formation (Middle Jurassic), southern Israel.

- Unconformities - Clear angular unconformities provide unequivocal evidence of the relative age of two rock sequences.
- Cross-bedding (aka Cross-stratification) - These structures are common in rocks laid down by the action of wind or water currents and in some volcaniclastic rocks. Minor erosional events during the overall deposition give rise to small-scale angular unconformities. There are three ways a cross bed can be used:
  - Troughs of trough cross beds, in which the concave part of the trough points up.
  - The tangential (end) part of the cross bed is always on the bottom of the cross bed.
  - Many cross beds are stacked, and truncation always happens up section.
- Graded bedding - In certain types of clastic sedimentary rock, the grain or clast size varies systematically from the base of the bed to its top. In a normally graded bed the grain or clast size is largest at the base and the bed is said to fine upwards. Beds deposited by density underflows such as turbidites typically show normal grading. Reverse grading or coarsening upwards is a characteristic of some alluvial fan deposits, so it is important to understand the depositional environment before using this particular criterion.
- Sole markings - Many beds deposited by density underflows, such as turbidites, have erosional bases. Although there is no clear angular unconformity developed in most cases, there are characteristic structures formed at the base of the bed. Also includes are flute casts, grooves, and tool marks.
- Load casts - These are formed when a higher density layer (e.g. a sand) is deposited on a lower density layer (e.g. a mud). Characteristic structures include flame structures that are forced up from the underlying low density layer.
- Mudcracks - Cracks in a desiccated mud layer, such as found on a dried-out lake bed or tidal flat, are often filled by an overlying sand layer. Mudcracks in cross section typically show a profile in which the filled sand layers are narrow at the bottom and wider at the top resembling a V shape.
- Ripple marks - Ripples are typically rounded at the base (trough) and sharp (or truncated) at the top (crest).
- Neptunian dykes - These are formed when the top of a bed is temporarily exposed and a fissure develops by processes such as earthquake activity or solution of carbonates. The fissure becomes filled either during the period of exposure by contemporaneous, possibly wind-blown material, or when deposition resumes, by the same material as the overlying bed.
- Rubbly tops and chilled bases of lava flows - Basaltic lava flows often have bases that show evidence of rapid cooling against the land surface and broken, rubbly tops caused by the continued flow of partially solidified lava.
- Pillow structures in subaqueous lava flows.
- Trace fossils - The trails of bottom feeders such as Cruziana, u-shaped burrows of suspension feeders such as Diplocraterion and traces of root systems can provide clear evidence of way-up.
- Fossils in life position (e.g. coral, articulated crinoids) can give a paleo up direction.
- Void-fill structure (known in some texts as simply a geopetal structure) is a void or cavity in a rock that has been part-filled with sediments or mineral deposits, that indicates an initial horizontal that can be used as a way up structure and as a precise measure of post-depositional tilting. There are two main examples of this:
  - Fossils - Any fossil that starts with a significant internal cavity may develop such structures, like molluscs and brachiopods. The initial fill is often of sediments with the remaining part filled by calcite, giving a clear geopetal structure.
  - Vesicles - Many lavas are vesicular in the upper part of a flow. These vesicles are often infilled by minerals (especially zeolites) and/or weathering products from the lava to form an amygdaloidal texture. Some two-phase amygdales, such as where a mineral has grown in a vesicle that was part-filled by fluid affecting the mineral form (e.g. opal versus calcedony), can be used as geopetal structures.

== Issues with terms ==
In general, geopetal seems to be used in the U.S., while way up structure is used in the UK. "Geopetal structure", in some circles, is used exclusively for the void fill example, and nothing else. Some geologists use neither term, and might use something else, like topping indicator.

== See also ==
- Sedimentary structures
