= Soft-sediment deformation structures =

Geologic formation

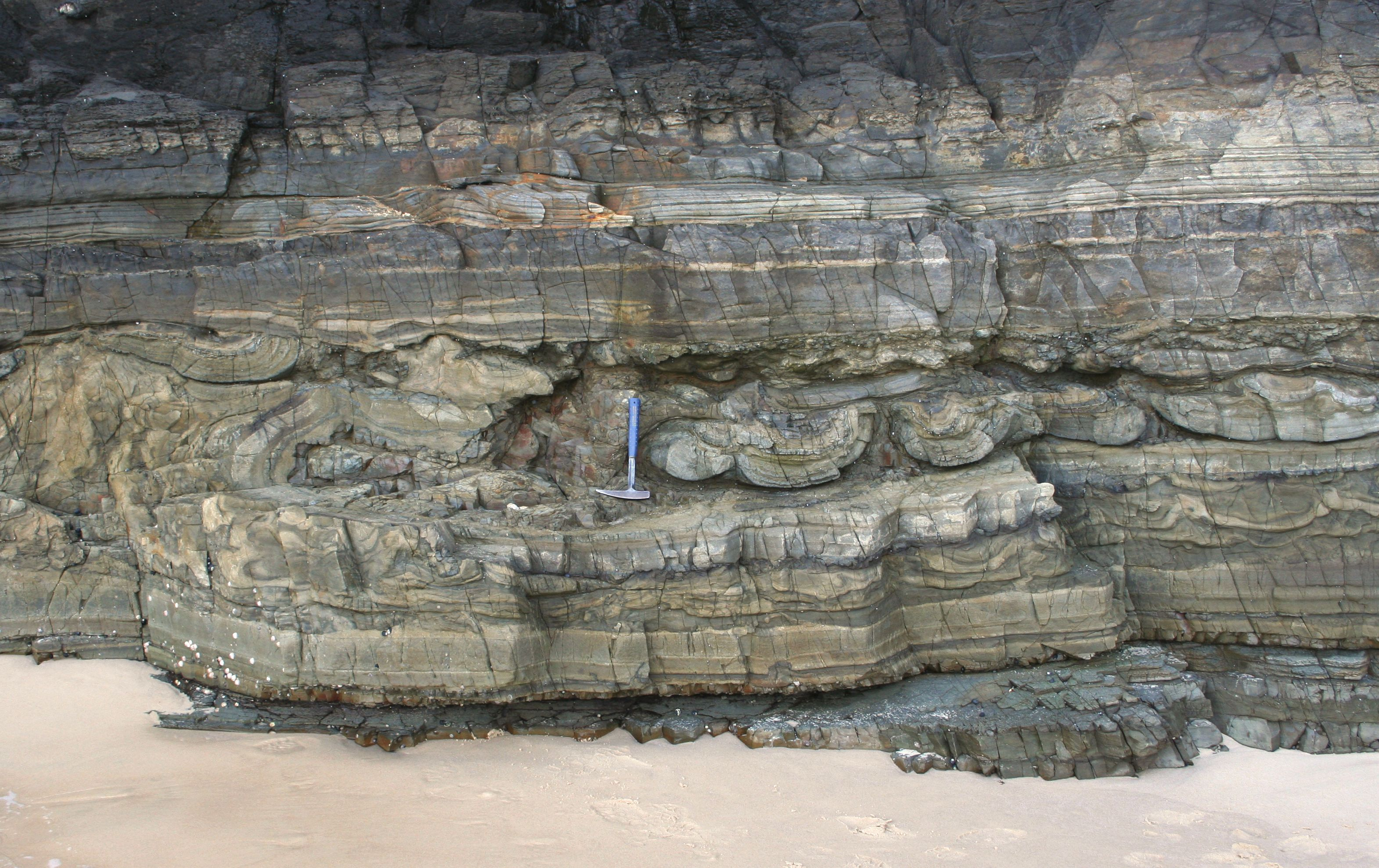
Cross-sectional view of deformed beds caused by soft-sediment deformation in the Booti Booti Sandstone (Mississippian), New South Wales. (Rygel, M.C.)

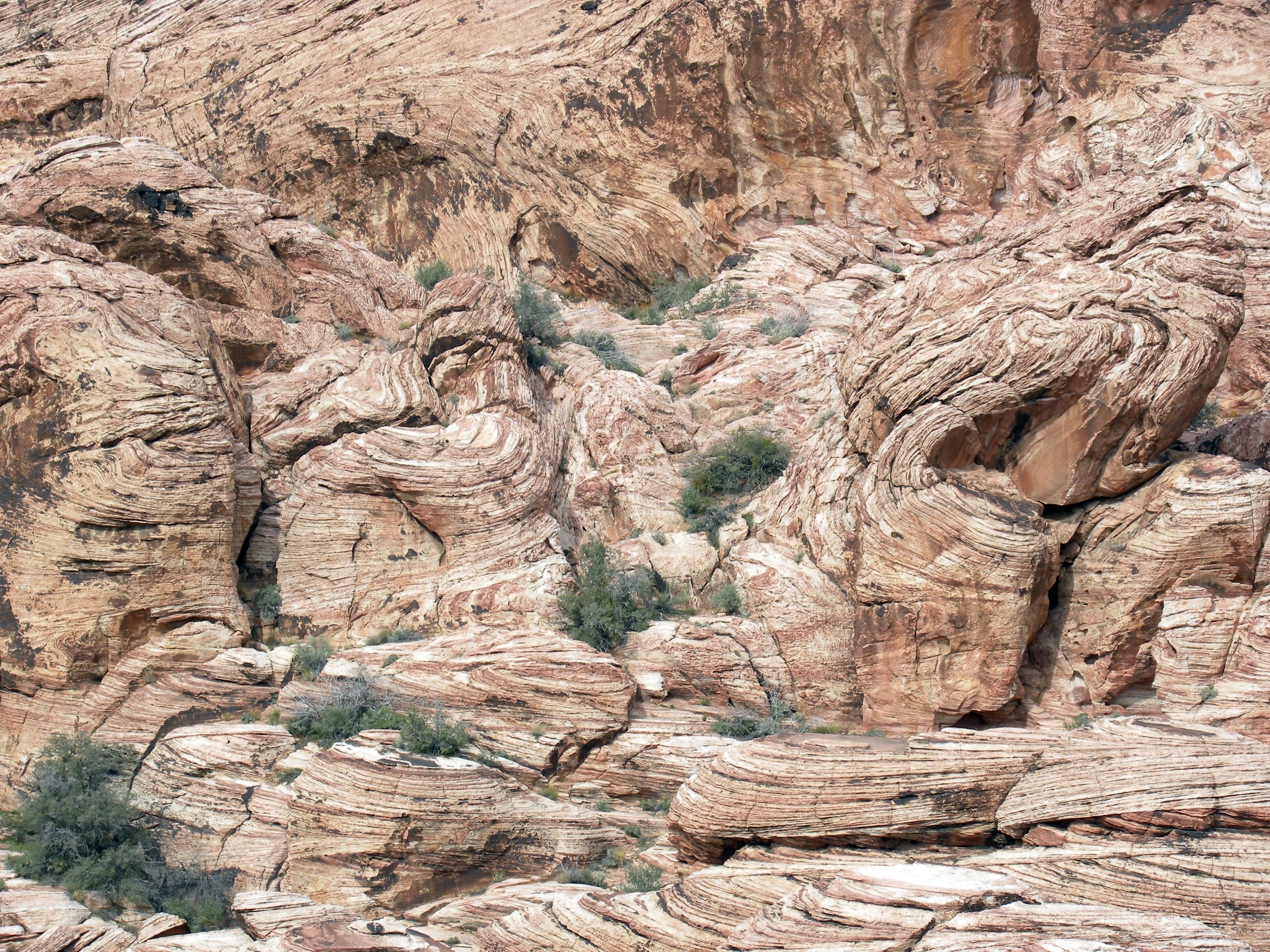
Aztec Sandstone (Lower Jurassic) in southern Nevada showing distorted eolian sand beds.

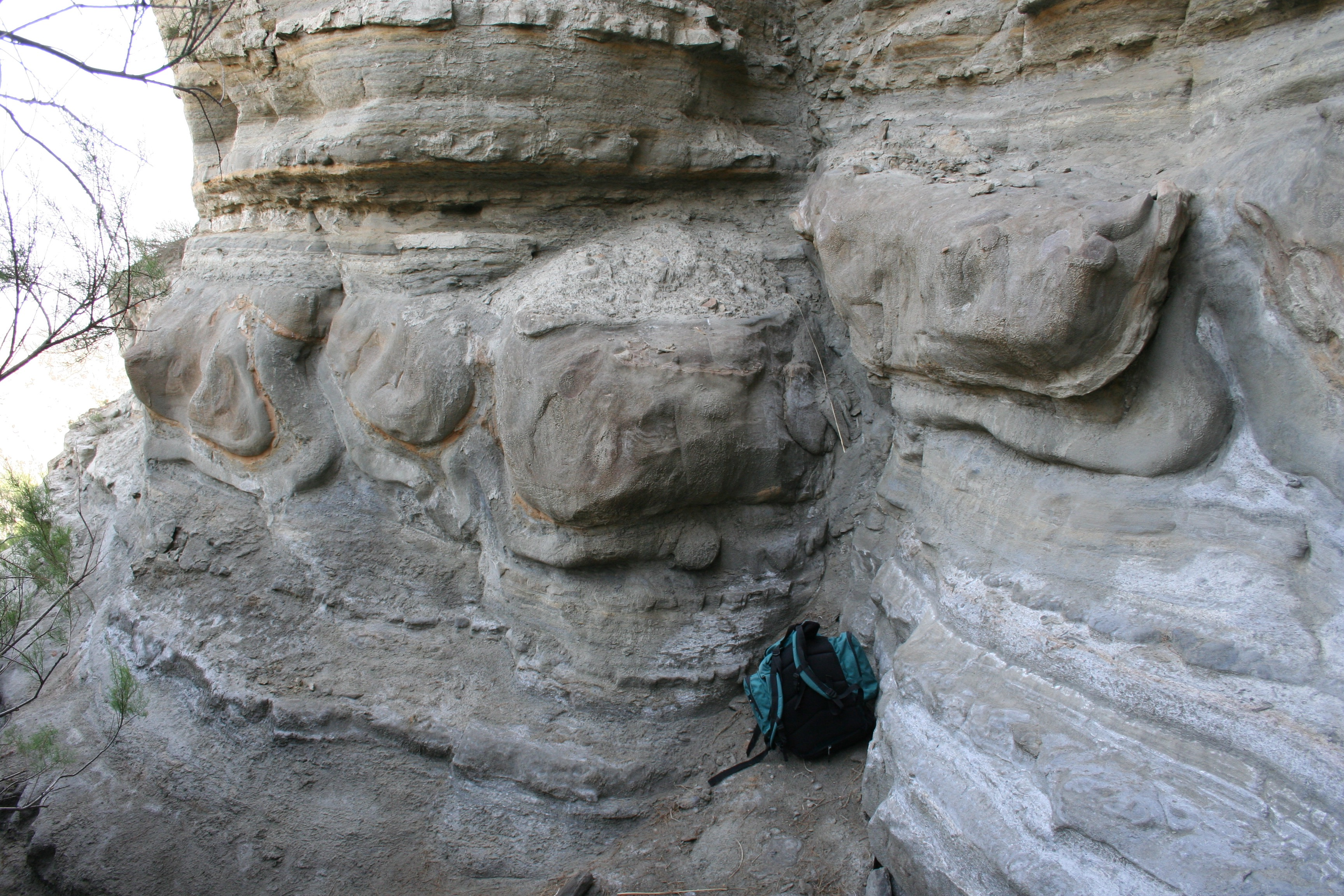
Large soft sediment deformation structures in turbidites, SE Spain. These are probably best described as flame structures, or perhaps ball-and-pillow structures. Backpack is around half a meter high. A small reverse fault runs through the outcrop in the centre of the image.

Soft-sediment deformation structures develop at deposition or shortly after, during the first stages of the sediment's consolidation. This is because the sediments need to be "liquid-like" or unsolidified for the deformation to occur. These formations have also been put into a category called water-escape structures by Lowe (1975). The most common places for soft-sediment deformations to materialize are in deep water basins with turbidity currents, rivers, deltas, and shallow-marine areas with storm impacted conditions. This is because these environments have high deposition rates, which allows the sediments to pack loosely.

== Types of soft-sediment deformation structures ==
- Convolute bedding forms when complex folding and crumpling of beds or laminations occur. This type of deformation is found in fine or silty sands, and is usually confined to one rock layer. Convolute laminations are found in flood plain, delta, point-bar, and intertidal-flat deposits. They generally range in size from 3 to 25 cm, but there have been larger formations recorded as several meters thick.
- Flame structures consist of mud and are wavy or "flame" shaped. These flames usually extend into an overlying sandstone layer. This deformation is caused from sand being deposited onto mud, which is less dense. Load casts, technically a subset of sole markings, below, are the features which form alongside flame structures. Flames are thin fingers of mud injected upward into the overlying sands, while load casts are the pendulous knobs of sand that descend downwards into the mud between the flames.
- Slump structures are mainly found in sandy shales and mudstones, but may also be in limestones, sandstones, and evaporites. They are a result of the displacement and movement of unconsolidated sediments, and are found in areas with steep slopes and fast sedimentation rates. These structures often are faulted.
- Dish structures are thin, dish-shaped formations that normally occur in siltstones and sandstones. The size of each "dish" often ranges from 1 cm to 50 cm in size, and forms as a result of dewatering. Pillar structures often appear along with dish structures and also form by dewatering. They have a vertical orientation, which cuts across laminated or massive sands. These formations can range from a few millimeters in diameter to larger than a meter.
- Sole markings are found on the underside of sedimentary rocks that overlie shale beds, usually sandstones. They are used for determining the flow direction of old currents because of their directional features. Sole markings form from the erosion of a bed, which creates a groove that is later filled in by sediment.
- Seismites are sedimentary beds disturbed by seismic waves from earthquakes. They are commonly used to interpret the seismic history of an area. The term has also been applied to soft sediment deformation structures, including sand volcanos, sand blows, and certain clastic dikes.
- Vertebrate tracks made in water saturated sediments can also produce similar structures to those observed in convolute bedding and seismites, as the sediment is shaken and deformed when animals step through it.
