= Theodor Fuchs =

Austrian geologist and paleontologist

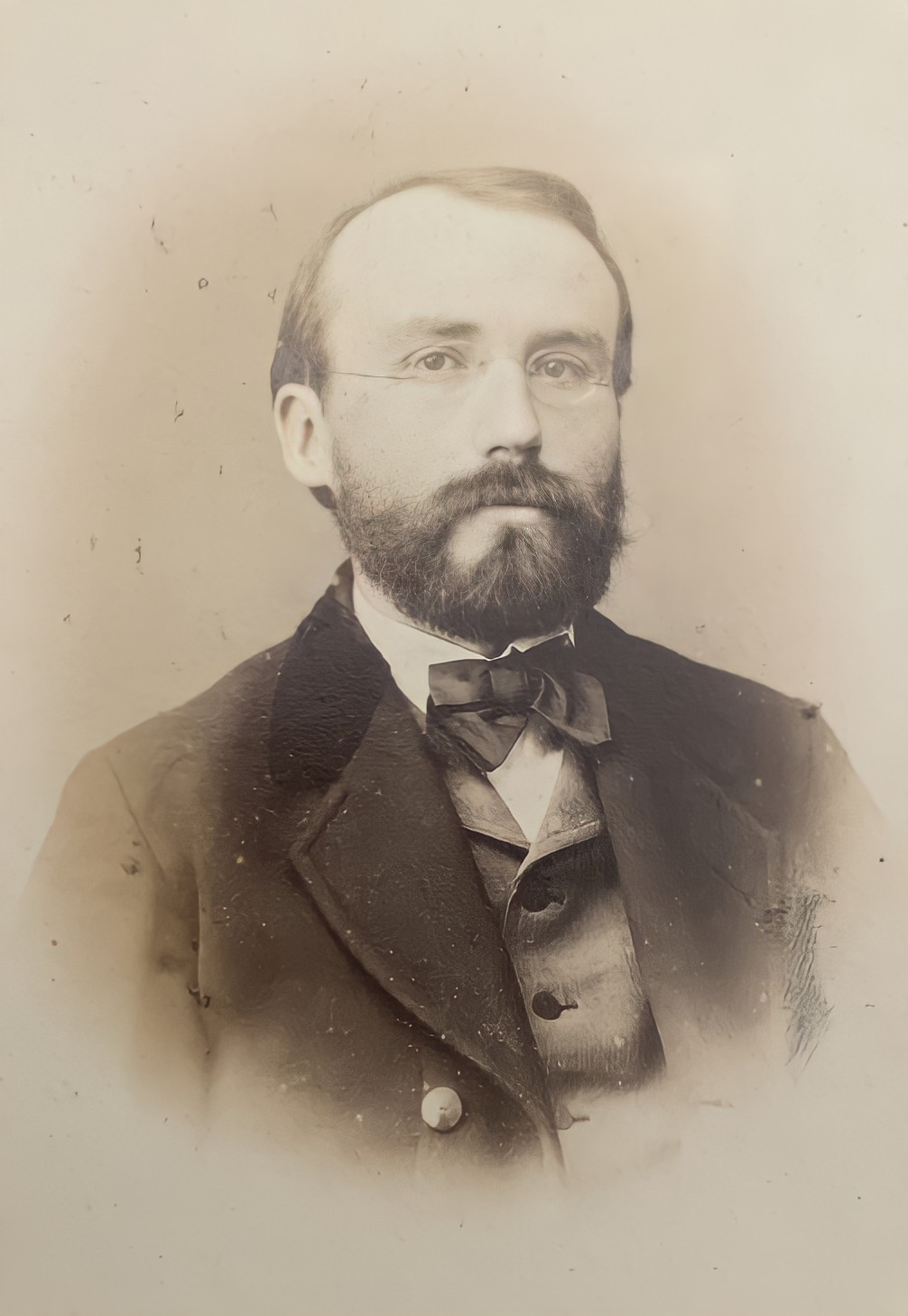
- Born: 15 September 1842; Eperies
- Died: 5 October 1925 (aged 83); Steinach am Brenner, Austria
- Education: University of Vienna (doctorate)
- Occupations: geologist, paleontologist
- Known for: studies of stratigraphic conditions of the Late Tertiary of the Vienna Basin and investigations of Tertiary deposits in the Mediterranean
- Notable work: proposed the Chattian age

Theodor Fuchs (15 September 1842 in Eperies – 5 October 1925 in Steinach am Brenner) was an Austrian geologist and paleontologist.

He studied geology and paleontology at the University of Vienna as a pupil of Eduard Suess (doctorate 1863). Following graduation, he worked as an assistant at the Hofmineralienkabinett in Vienna, being named its curator in 1880. From 1889 to 1904 he was director of the geologic-paleontological department at the Natural History Museum in Vienna. In 1897 he became an associate professor of paleontology at the university.

His primary research dealt with studies of stratigraphic conditions of the Late Tertiary of the Vienna Basin and investigations of Tertiary deposits in the Mediterranean.

In 1894 he proposed the Chattian age, a chronostratigraphic stage of the Oligocene epoch. In 1895 he was the first to report on soft sediment deformations known today as "load casts" — at the time, Fuchs used the descriptive term Fließwülste (flow crests).

== Selected works ==
- Die Conchylienfauna der Eocaenbildungen von Kalinowka, im Gouvernement Cherson im südlichen Russland, 1869 – The conch fauna in the Eocene strata at Kalinovka, in the Kherson Governorate of southern Russia.
- Beitraege zur Geologie und Palaeontologie der libyschen Wüste und der angrenzenden Gebiete von Aegypten, 1883 (with Karl Alfred von Zittel) – Contributions to geology and paleontology of the Libyan Desert and neighboring areas of Egypt.
- Studien über Fucoiden und Hieroglyphen, 1895 – Studies on fucoides and hieroglyphs.
- Über einen Versuch die problematische Gattung Palaeodictyon auf mechanischem Wege künstlich herzustellen, 1905 – On an attempt to artificially produce tunnels formed by the problematic genus Paleodictyon.
- Wissenschaft und religion. Eine naturwissenschaftlich-philosophische studie, 1911 – Science and religion. A scientific and philosophical study.

He was a proponent of Esperanto; in 1912 he translated the introductory chapter of Eduard Suess's Das Antlitz der Erde ("The face of the Earth") as La vizaĝo de la tero.
