= Ball-and-pillow structures =

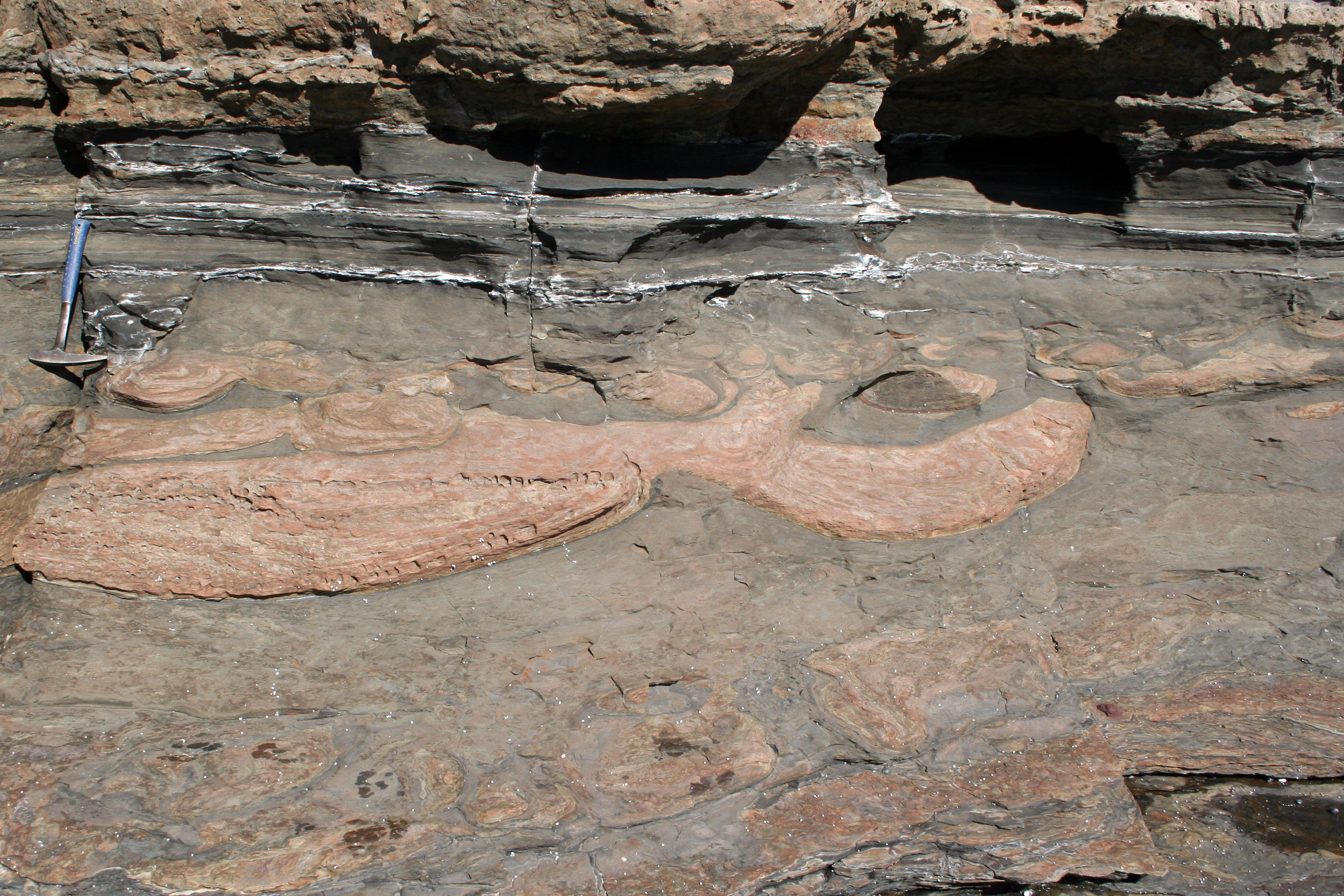
Ball-and-pillow structures (caused by soft-sediment deformation) in the Pebbley Beach Formation (Permian), New South Wales

Ball-and-pillow structures are masses of clastic sediment that take the form of isolated pillows or protruding ball structures. These soft-sediment deformations are usually found at the base of sandstone beds that are interbedded with mudstone. It is also possible to find ball-and-pillows in limestone beds that overlie shale, but it's less common. They are normally hemispherical or kidney shaped, and range in size from a few inches to several feet.

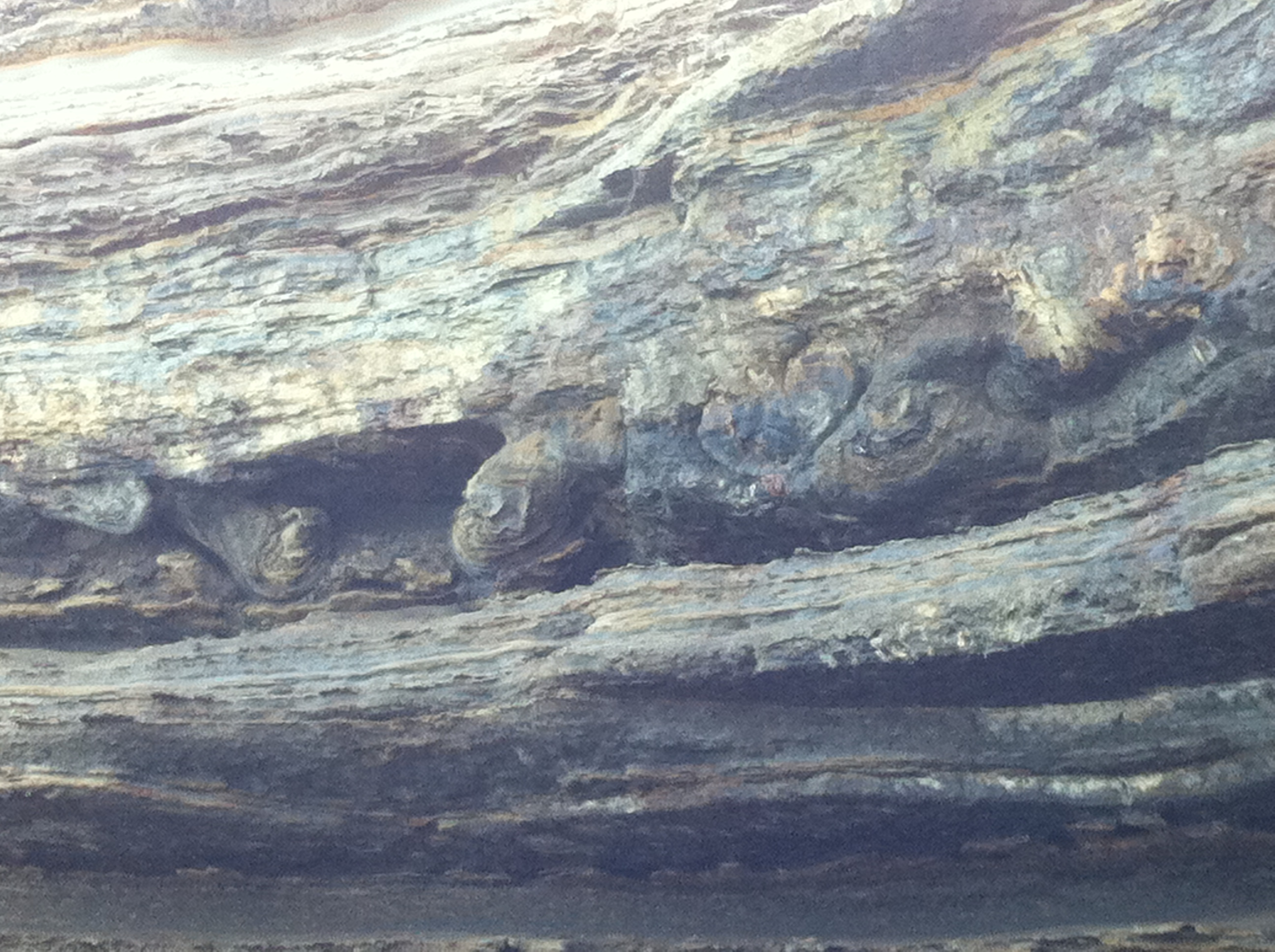
Ball-and-pillow structures, Merry Beach, (Snapper Point Formation), South Coast of NSW

== Development and preservation ==
Ball-and-pillow deformations are a result of a physical shock that has been applied to unconsolidated sediment. This shock causes rupturing to occur in the sedimentary rock layer, which induces instability. Individual lobes caused by this unstable state break off and move downward, settling into the underlying layers. There may also be a repeated lobe detachment, causing a greater downward movement into the sediments below. The "pillows" that have now been produced typically retain their original bedding compositions.

Both Kuenen (1958) and Owen (1996) have duplicated ball-and-pillow structures in the laboratory, which was done by applying a shock to multilayered strata. These experiments further conclude that earthquakes, erupting volcanoes, or meteoric impacts can create these formations.

== History ==
The first record of these structures was in 1916, when Smith wrote a paper called "Ball or Pillow-form Structures in Sandstones." Here he referred to these deformations as pillow-forms or ball structures. The actual term "ball-and-pillow" came from Potter and Pettijohn (1963), when they cited Smith's work incorrectly.

== See also ==
- Load cast
- Flame structure
