= Susan Ellis (geophysicist) =

New Zealand geophysicist

Susan Marian Ellis (born 1965) is a geophysicist based in New Zealand, who specialises in modelling the geodynamics of the Earth's crust deformation, at different scales. Ellis is a principal scientist at GNS Science and her main interests are in subduction, seismology, tectonics, crust and petrology. Ellis's current work focuses on the influence of faulting on stresses in the crust, and how this is related to geological hazard and the tectonic settings in New Zealand.

== Education ==
Born in 1965, Ellis earned a Bachelor of Science degree with honours at Victoria University of Wellington. She subsequently completed her PhD in 1995 at Dalhousie University, where she examined the forces driving continental collision using numerical models, applied to Tibet and New Zealand. This was followed by postdoctoral fellowships at Dalhousie University (1996–1997), as part of the Lithoprobe programme, and the University of Berne, studying the geodynamics of the Swiss Alps.

== Career and impact ==
Ellis has worked with and developed 2D and 3D numerical methods incorporating faults, inelastic rheology of the crust and mantle, and thermal and fluid evolution. She has investigated studies of rifting exhumation mechanics in Papua New Guinea; mechanics of the Wilson cycle; fluid and magma generation and flow in the Taupō Volcanic Zone; subduction initiation; and subduction dynamics. Her work has focused on the influence of faulting on stresses in the crust, and the interplay between seismic and interseismic deformation, as applied to New Zealand tectonic settings.

== Awards and honours ==
In 2005, Ellis was elected president of the New Zealand Geophysics Society (which has since merged to become the New Zealand Geoscience Society). In 2020, she was awarded the Geological Society of New Zealand's "New Zealand McKay Hammer Award" for the most outstanding published research on New Zealand geology in the preceding three years. The citation reads "For a body of work as a leading geodynamic modeller, making pivotal contributions to our understanding of tectonics".

In 2021, Ellis was a co-winner (along with first author Donna Eberhart Phillips) of the Geological Society of New Zealand's "New Zealand Geophysics Prize", the society's top geophysical award bestowed upon the author or authors of the most meritorious recent publication in the field of geophysics.

== Selected work ==
- Sun, T.; Saffer, D.; Ellis, S. (2020). Mechanical and hydrological effects of seamount subduction on megathrust stress and slip. Nature Geoscience, 13(3), pp. 249–255.
- Webber, S.; Ellis, S.; Fagereng, Å. 2018. "Virtual shear box" experiments of stress and slip cycling within a subduction interface mélange. Earth and Planetary Science Letters, 488: 27-35.
- Ellis, S.; Fagereng, A.; Barker, D.H.N.; Henrys, S.A.; Saffer, D.; Wallace, L.M.; Williams, C.A.; Harris, R. 2015. Fluid budgets along the northern Hikurangi subduction margin, New Zealand : the effect of a subducting seamount on fluid pressure. Geophysical Journal International, 202(1): 277-297.
- Ellis, S.; Little, T.A.; Wallace, L.M.; Hacker, B.R.; Buiter, S.J.H. 2011. Feedback between rifting and diapirism can exhume ultrahigh-pressure rocks. Earth and Planetary Science Letters, 311(3/4): 427-438.
- Ellis, S.; Wilson, C.J.N.; Bannister, S.; Bibby, H.M.; Heise, W.; Wallace, L.M.; Patterson, N.G. 2007. A future magma inflation event under the rhyolitic Taupo volcano, New Zealand : numerical models based on constraints from geochemical, geological, and geophysical data. Journal of Volcanology and Geothermal Research, 168(1-4): 1-27.
- Ellis, S.; Beavan, R.J.; Eberhart-Phillips, D.; Stöckhert, B. 2006. Simplified models of the Alpine Fault seismic cycle: stress transfer in the mid-crust. Geophysical Journal International, 166(1): 386-402.
