= Laura Wallace =

American geophysicist

Laura Wallace FRSNZ
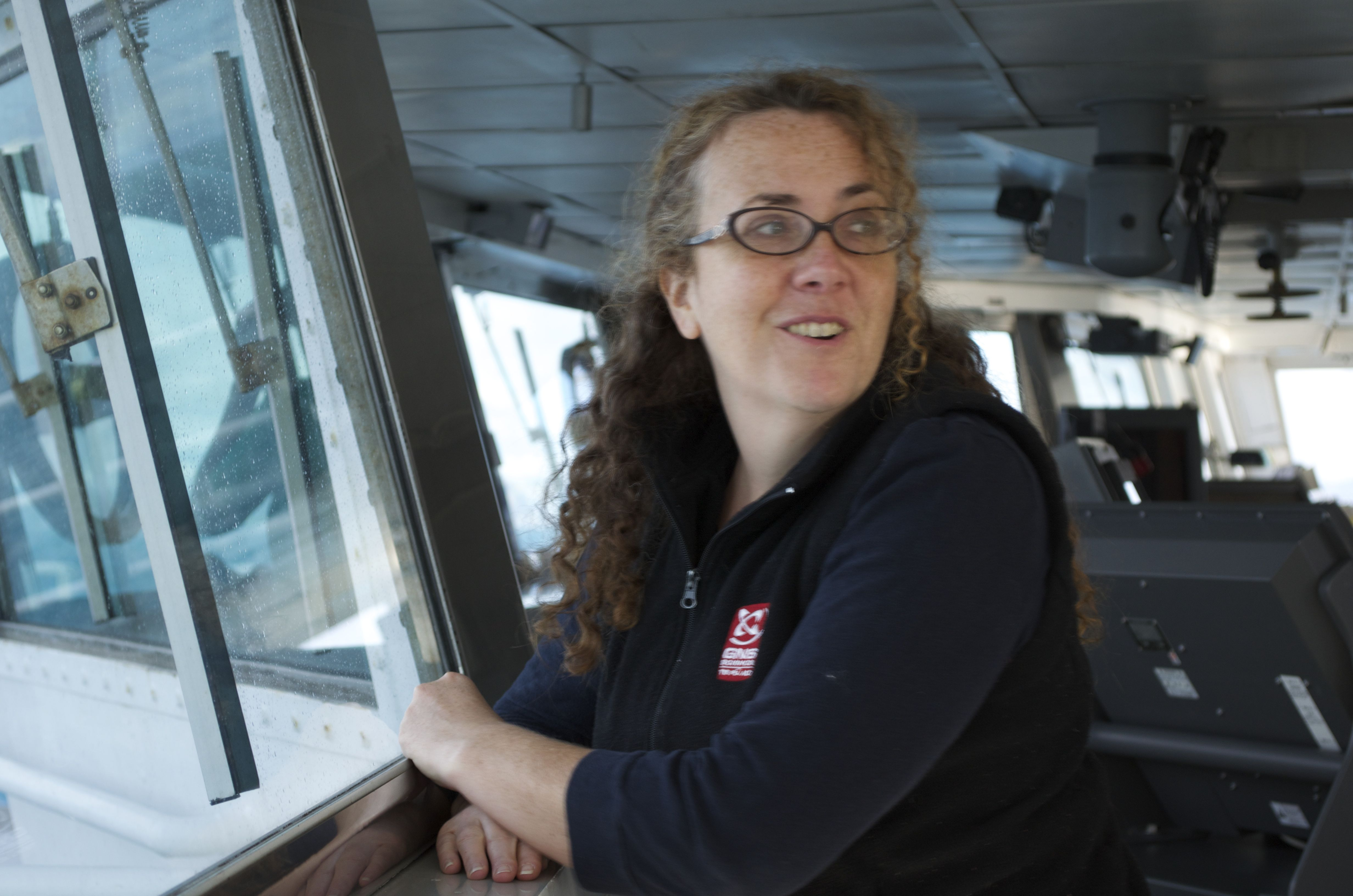
- Born: Laura Martin Wallace
- Education: University of California, Santa Cruz (PhD)
- Awards: Fellow, American Geophysical Union (2026)
- Scientific career
- Workplaces: GNS Science
- Thesis: Tectonics and arc-continent collision in Papua New Guinea : insights from geodetic, geophysical, and geologic data (2002)

Laura Martin Wallace FRSNZ is a geodetic principal scientist who works between the University of Texas at Austin and GNS Science in New Zealand. She was elected Fellow of the Royal Society Te Apārangi in 2018 and of the American Geophysical Union in 2026.

== Early life and education ==
Wallace grew up in Augusta, Georgia. She intended to study English literature at university and had dreamed of becoming a writer. Wallace completed a geology course during her undergraduate degree at the University of North Carolina at Chapel Hill, and switched her focus from literature to earth sciences. She graduated with honours in 1995 before moving to the University of California, Santa Cruz for her graduate studies. She studied the tectonics of Papua New Guinea using geodetic and geophysical data. After completing her doctoral degree, Wallace moved to New Zealand to study the origins of local tectonic activity.

== Research and career ==
Wallace was involved with designing the network of the 150 continuous Global Positioning System (cGPS) reference stations that are located around New Zealand to study local geophysics. She makes use of cGPS to understand the milli-metre scale movement of land. In 2002, she was the first to demonstrate slow slip events at the Hikurangi subduction zone east of Gisborne, New Zealand. The Hikurangi subduction zone is one of New Zealand's most significant geological hazards and can result in earthquakes and tsunamis. The Hikurangi Ocean Bottom Investigation of Tremor and Slow Slip (HOBITSS) project included a network of seafloor instruments that could measure the vertical movement of the seafloor, deployed from the R/V Tangaroa. This instrumentation allowed for high resolution mapping of an area that was previously inaccessible. The slow slip events that occurred in the Hikurangi occurred for about two weeks and can cause up to 20 cm of movement along the New Zealand and Pacific Plates. She has shown that these slip events occur on five year cycles and at depths of up to 50 km – though some are shallow enough to permit sample collection and analysis. Wallace showed that slow-slip events can cause the shallower parts of a fault – the parts that are involved with earthquakes and tsunamis – can rupture.

In 2018 Wallace led the installation of sub-seafloor observatories off the coast of Gisborne, New Zealand. One of the observatories, Te Matakite, was the first observatory in New Zealand that was located at a subduction plate boundary and can provide information that cannot be seen by the human eye. She has worked with the Australian and New Zealand Integrated Ocean Drilling Program (IODP) Consortium to build the observatories. The instruments and components for the observatories were deployed from the Hawke's Bay coast in 2018. In 2020 it was announced that five of the thirty instruments worth $30,000 could not be located.

Wallace was elected to the Royal Society Te Apārangi in 2018. She is a member of the East Coast Lab, a collective of scientists who look to understand and communicate risks associated with natural hazards. In 2018 Wallace was awarded the Geoscience Society of New Zealand McKay Hammer award, which recognised the ‘most meritorious contribution to geology’. She was elected a Fellow of the American Geophysical Union in 2026.

== Selected publications ==
- Wallace, Laura M.; Beavan, John; McCaffrey, Robert; Darby, Desmond (22 December 2004). "Subduction zone coupling and tectonic block rotations in the North Island, New Zealand". Journal of Geophysical Research: Solid Earth. 109 (B12): B12406. Bibcode:2004JGRB..10912406W. doi:10.1029/2004JB003241.
- Wallace, Laura M.; Beavan, John; McCaffrey, Robert; Berryman, Kelvin; Denys, Paul (1 January 2007). "Balancing the plate motion budget in the South Island, New Zealand using GPS, geological and seismological data". Geophysical Journal International. 168 (1): 332–352. Bibcode:2007GeoJI.168..332W. doi:10.1111/j.1365-246X.2006.03183.x.
- Wallace, L.M.; Reyners, M.E.; Cochran, U.A.; Bannister, S.; Barnes, P.M.; Berryman, K.R.; Downes, G.L.; Eberhart-Phillips, D.; Fagereng, A.; Ellis, S.M.; Nicol, A.; McCaffrey, R.; Beavan, R.J.; Henrys, S.A.; Sutherland, R.; Barker, D.H.N.; Litchfield, N.J.; Townend, J.; Robinson, R.; Bell, R.E.; Wilson, K.J.; Power, W.L. 2009 Characterizing the seismogenic zone of a major plate boundary subduction thrust : Hikurangi Margin, New Zealand. Geochemistry, Geophysics, Geosystems, 10(10): Q10006; doi:10.1029/2009GC002610
- Wallace, Laura M.; Beavan, John (2 December 2010). "Diverse slow slip behavior at the Hikurangi subduction margin, New Zealand". Journal of Geophysical Research: Solid Earth. 115 (B12): B12402. Bibcode:2010JGRB..11512402W. doi:10.1029/2010JB007717.
