= Donna Eberhart-Phillips =

Geologist

Donna Mae Eberhart-Phillips
- Education: Stanford University
- Scientific career
- Thesis: Investigations of crustal structure and active tectonic processes in the Coast Ranges, Central California (1989)

Donna Eberhart-Phillips is a geologist known for her research on subduction zones, especially in Alaska and New Zealand.

== Education and career ==
Eberhart-Phillips earned her Ph.D. in 1989 from Stanford University where she worked on the tectonic processes in California. As of 2021, Eberhart-Phillips has joint appointments at the University of California, Davies and GNS Science in Dunedin, New Zealand.

In 2018, Eberhart-Phillips was named a fellow of the American Geophysical Union who cited her "for fundamental contributions to the seismotectonic analysis of subduction zones and fault zones and innovations in seismic tomography."

== Research ==
Eberhart-Phillips uses seismic data to examine earthquakes in subduction zones in New Zealand, Alaska where she worked on the 2002 Denali earthquake, and California where she worked on the 1992 Landers earthquake. In California, Eberhart-Phillips works on changes in the seismic waves from earthquakes from the Hayward Fault Zone as they move through the delta where the Sacramento and San Joaquin reach the sea.

== Selected publications ==
- Eberhart-Phillips, D.; Han, D-H.; Zoback, M. D. (January 1989). "Empirical relationships among seismic velocity, effective pressure, porosity, and clay content in sandstone". Geophysics. 54 (1): 82–89. Bibcode:1989Geop...54...82E. doi:10.1190/1.1442580. ISSN 0016-8033.
- Eberhart-Phillips, Donna; Reyners, Martin (1997). "Continental subduction and three-dimensional crustal structure: The northern South Island, New Zealand". Journal of Geophysical Research: Solid Earth. 102 (B6): 11843–11861. Bibcode:1997JGR...10211843E. doi:10.1029/96JB03555. ISSN 2156-2202.
- Eberhart-Phillips, D. (16 May 2003). "The 2002 Denali Fault Earthquake, Alaska: A Large Magnitude, Slip-Partitioned Event". Science. 300 (5622): 1113–1118. Bibcode:2003Sci...300.1113E. doi:10.1126/science.1082703. PMID 12750512. S2CID 33375651.
- Eberhart-Phillips, Donna; Michael, Andrew J. (1993). "Three-dimensional velocity structure, seismicity, and fault structure in the Parkfield Region, central California". Journal of Geophysical Research: Solid Earth. 98 (B9): 15737–15758. Bibcode:1993JGR....9815737E. doi:10.1029/93JB01029. ISSN 2156-2202.

== Awards and honors ==
- Fellow, American Geophysical Union (2018)
