= Load cast =

Bulges, lumps, and lobes that form on bedding planes

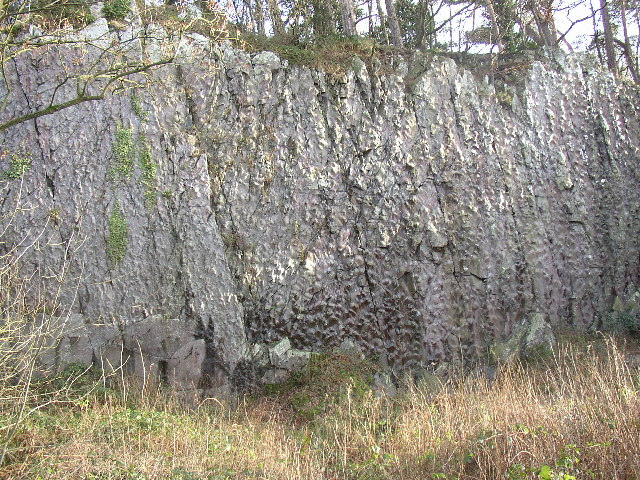
Load casts at vertically bedded sandstones at a "Donkey Rock" near Broughton-in-Furness in Northern England

Load casts are bulges, lumps, and lobes that can form on the bedding planes that separate the layers of sedimentary rocks. The lumps "hang down" from the upper layer into the lower layer, and typically form with fairly equal spacing. These features form during soft-sediment deformation shortly after sediment burial, before the sediments lithify. They can be created when a denser layer of sediment is deposited on top of a less-dense sediment. This arrangement is gravitationally unstable, which encourages formation of a Rayleigh-Taylor instability if the sediment becomes liquefied (for instance, by an imposed earthquake shock). Once the sediments can flow, the instability creates the "hanging" lobes and knobs of the load casts as plumes of the denser sediment descend into the less-dense layer.

Load casts are a common kind of sole marking.

== Terminology ==
The expression "load cast", sometimes also called a load structure, refers to a load (the denser layer) sinking into its underlying (less dense) cast (mold). Related to load casts are flame structures, load waves, and anticrests.

Extreme developments of load casts are pseudo-nodules and ball-and-pillow structures. In these extreme cases, the hanging lobe becomes almost or completely detached from the overlying bed, resulting in apparently isolated masses of the overlying material floating in the lower bed.

== History ==
Load casts were scientifically reported for the first time by the sedimentologist Theodor Fuchs in 1895 who called them in German Fließwülste (flow crests, flow warts). He also reproduced the structure experimentally. Later studies were conducted by Henry Clifton Sorby in 1908, Paul Kukuk in 1920, and by Robert Shrock in 1948.

== Description ==
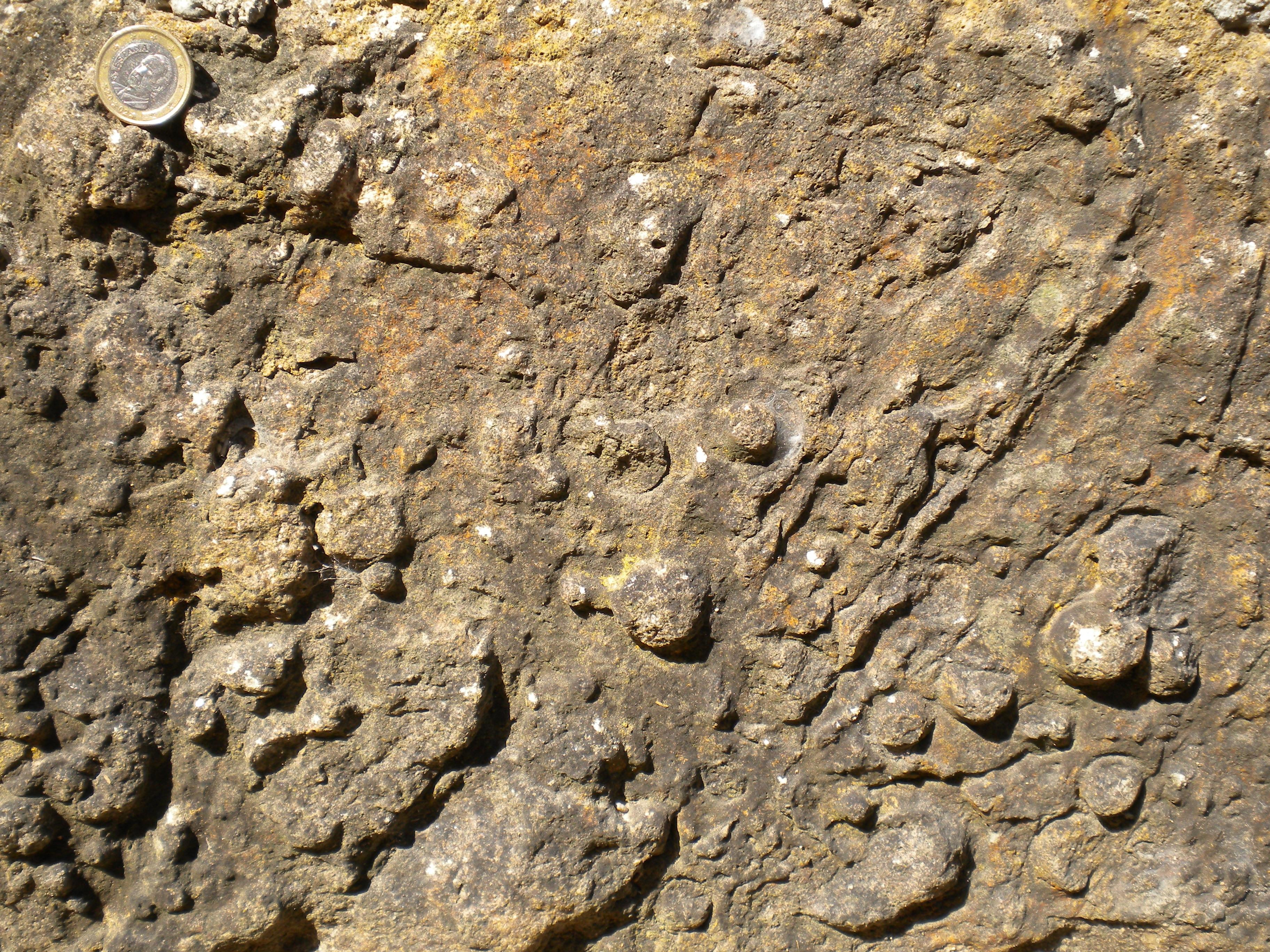
Wartlike load casts in Hettangian arkoses from the northern Aquitaine Basin

Load casts form on the underside of the overlying denser layer (sands, coarse sands, or gravels), which is superimposed on a less-dense hydroplastic layer (muds, silts or finer sands). The casts take on the form of slight bulges, swellings, deep or rounded sacks, knobby excrescences or highly irregular protuberances. In profile, they appear as a row of flattened, lobe-shaped masses of similar size, shape, and spacing bulging into the lower layer. Between the lobes penetrate flame-like fingers or diapir-like shapes from the underlying less-dense layer. In 3-D, the lobes reveal equant to elongated pillow shapes separated from each other by narrow clefts. In profile, the succession of lobes and fingers can be modelled as a row of semi-circular lobes touching each other at the finger tips; a characteristic wavelength L can consequently be attributed to the lobes. According to the contrast in density and viscosity of the specific layers, the wavelength produced by the instability varies considerably with values generally between a few millimeters and 10 centimeters. Extreme examples have been reported with wavelengths up to 10 meters.

Normally the lobes/pockets and the fingers/diapirs are relatively symmetrical about the vertical, but can become asymmetrical in some places. They lean then into a consistent direction, usually interpreted as the direction of the paleocurrent. Asymmetrical load casts are called squamiform or flow casts. In load casts, the flame-like fingers never completely pierce the upper layer, whereas in flame structures they do.

== Occurrence ==
Load casts appear in very different depositional environments. They are most common in turbidites, but can also occur in fluvial and shallow-marine settings. Occasionally they appear in lake sediments. They have even been found in layered igneous and pyroclastic successions. Good examples come from the Borrowdale Volcanic Series in the English Lake District and from the Carboniferous Bude Formation of southwestern England.

== Formation ==
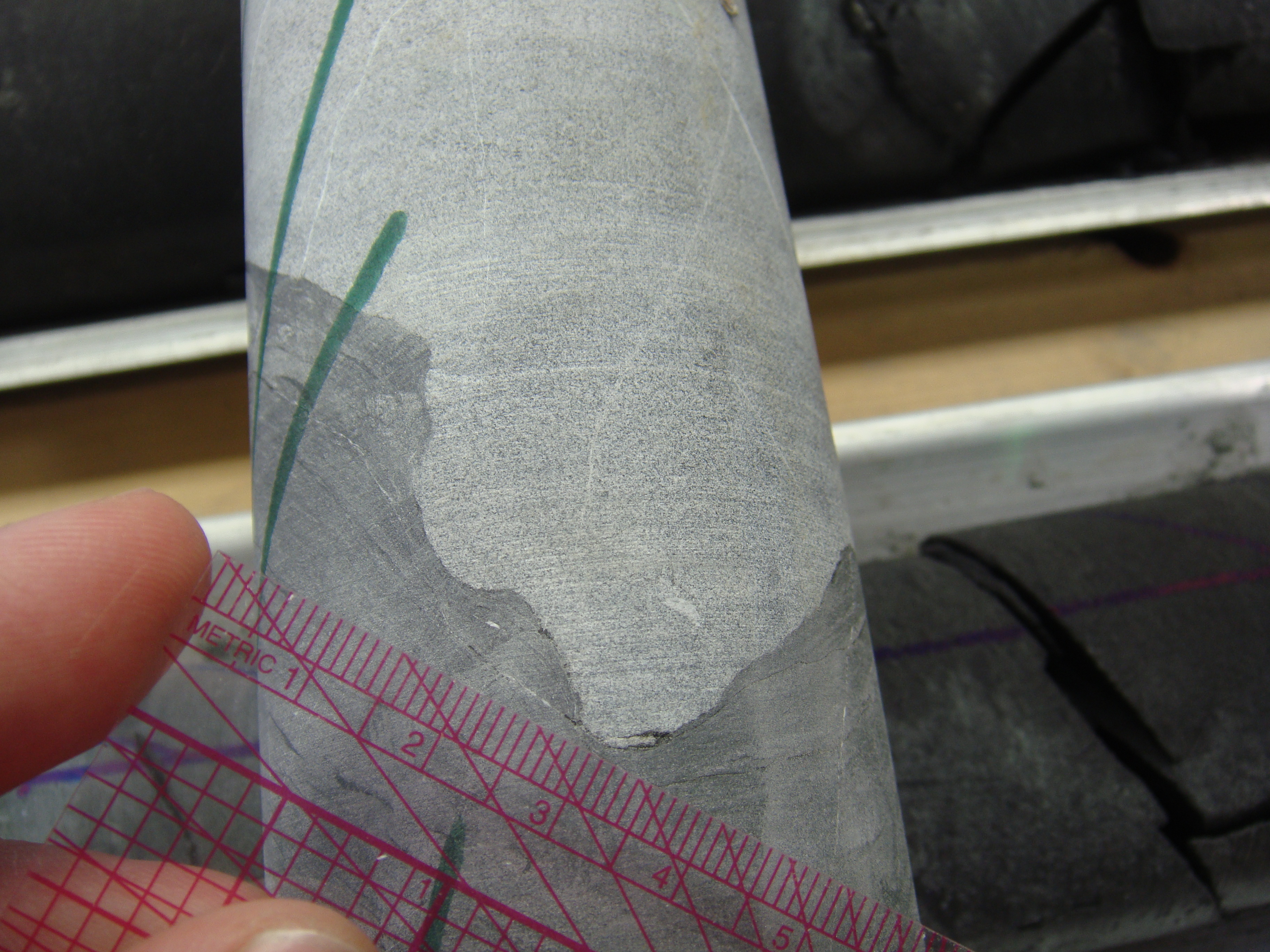
Drill core with a load cast

Essential for the formation of load casts is an inverted density layering, which is unstable under gravity, i.e. the potential energy of the layered system is not a minimum. Load casts are an example of the instability of an interface in a gravitationally unstable arrangement of layered sediments. The instability involved is called a Rayleigh-Taylor instability, whose driving forces are due to buoyancy.

The instability is, however, only latent because it is dependent on liquefaction to become real. The process of liquefaction implies a considerable to almost complete loss of yield strength of the layer involved. This important prerequisite has been appreciated since Sorby in 1908 (and later on by Shrock in 1948), who recognized the hydroplastic condition of the lower layer. On the basis that liquefaction is linked to shock(s), Sims was able in 1975 to correlate the formation of load casts in modern lake deposits with historical earthquakes which had liquefied the sediments.

== Literature ==
- Allen JRL (1984). Sedimentary structures. Their character and physical basis. Elsevier. ISBN 0-444-42232-3
- Allen JRL (1985). Principles of Physical Sedimentology. Chapman & Hall. ISBN 0-412-53090-2
- Reineck HE & Singh IB (1980). Depositional Sedimentary Environments. Springer-Verlag. ISBN 0-387-10189-6
