= Sole markings =

Sedimentary structures found on the bases of certain strata

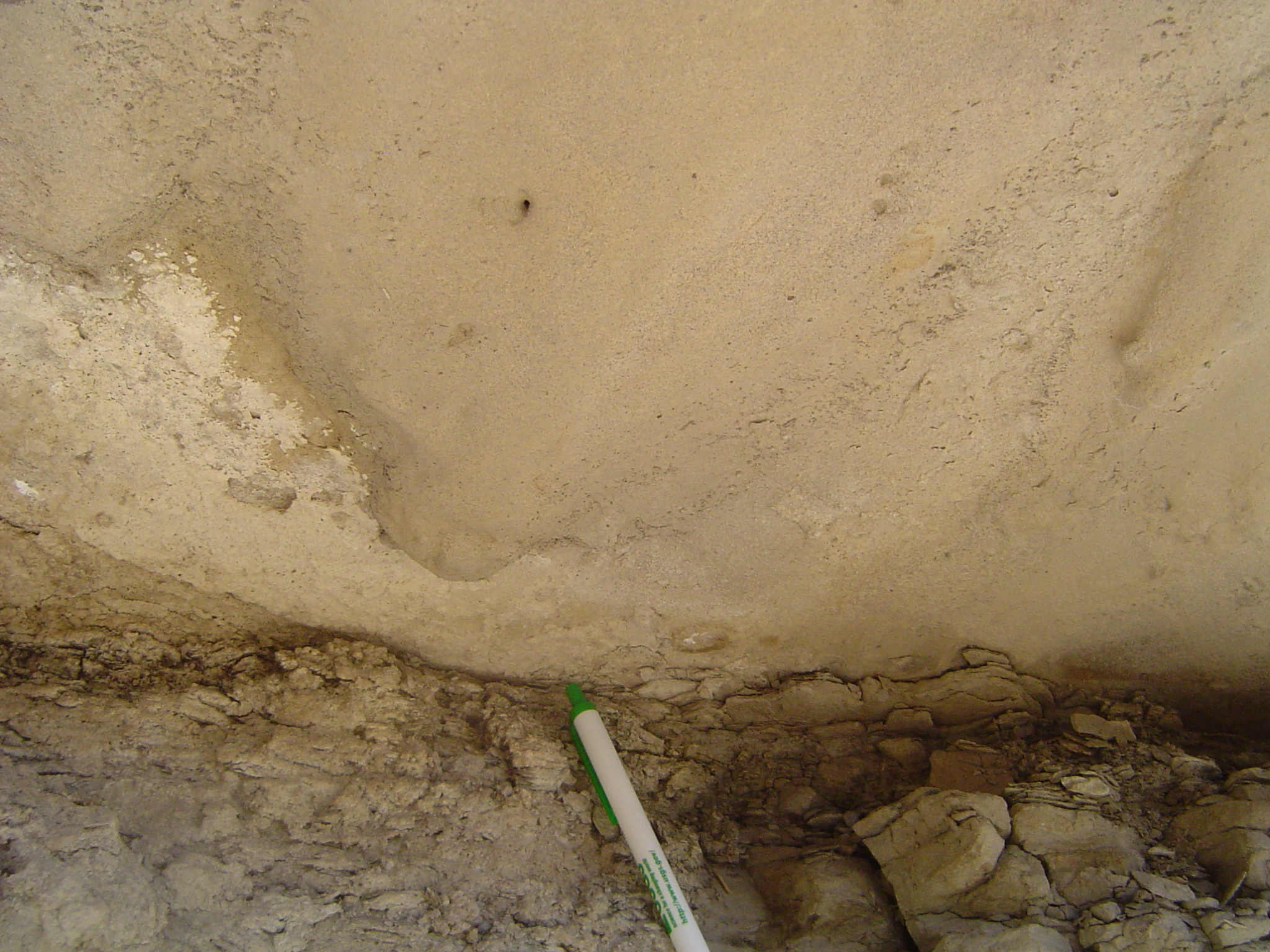
Flute cast from the Book Cliffs of Utah

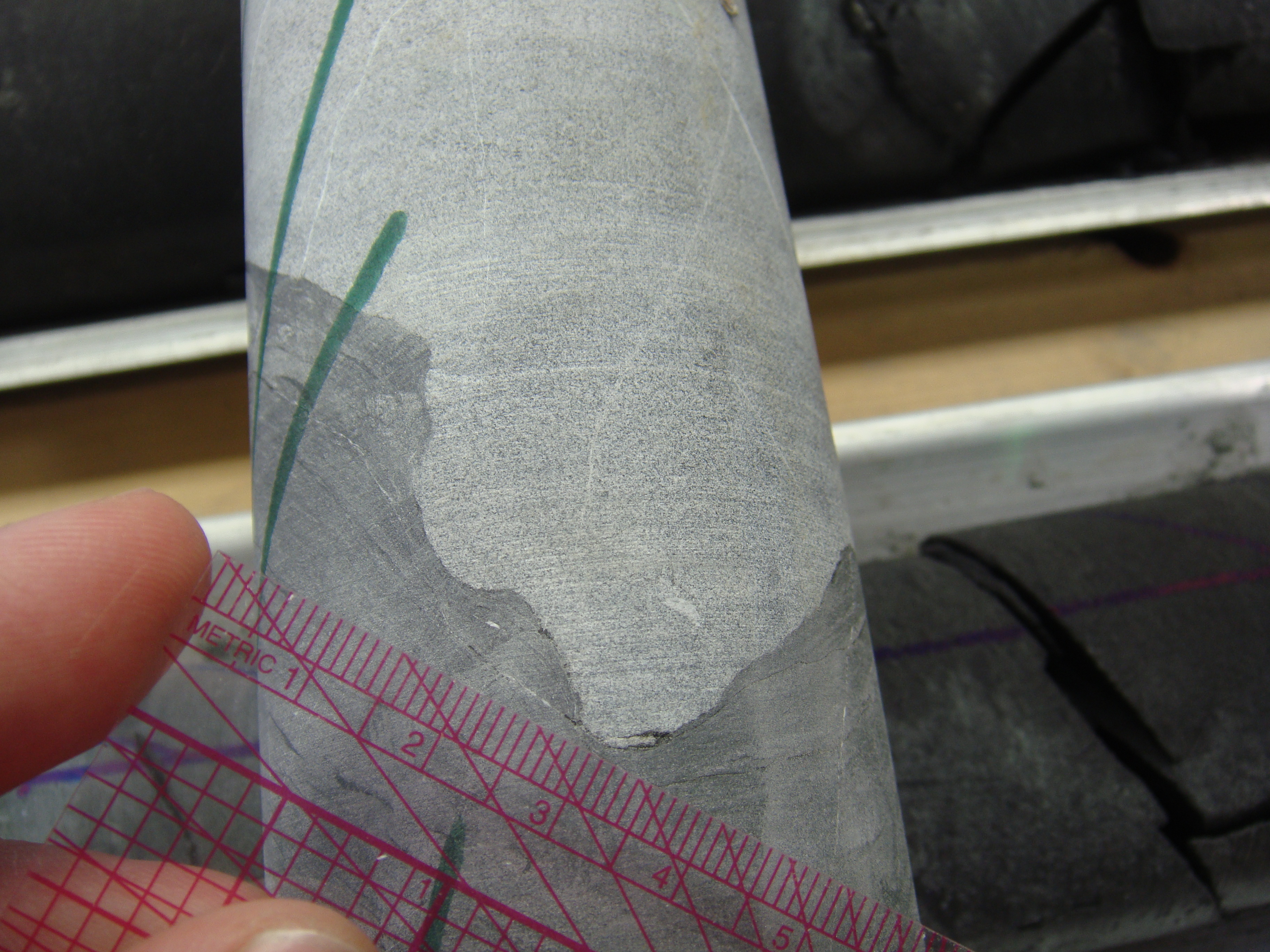
Load cast from drill core

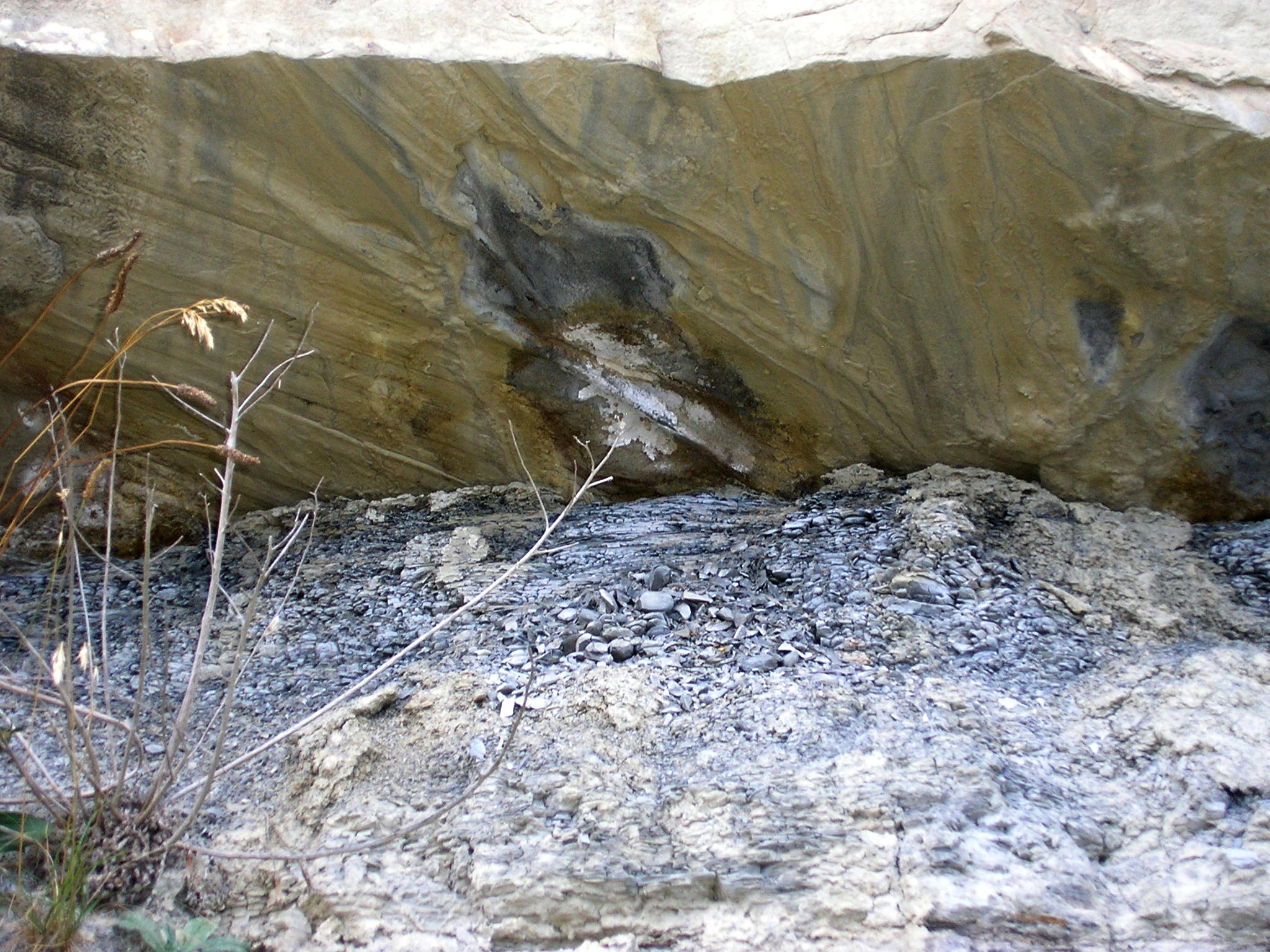
Groove casts on the base of a turbidite sandstone, Laga Basin, Italy

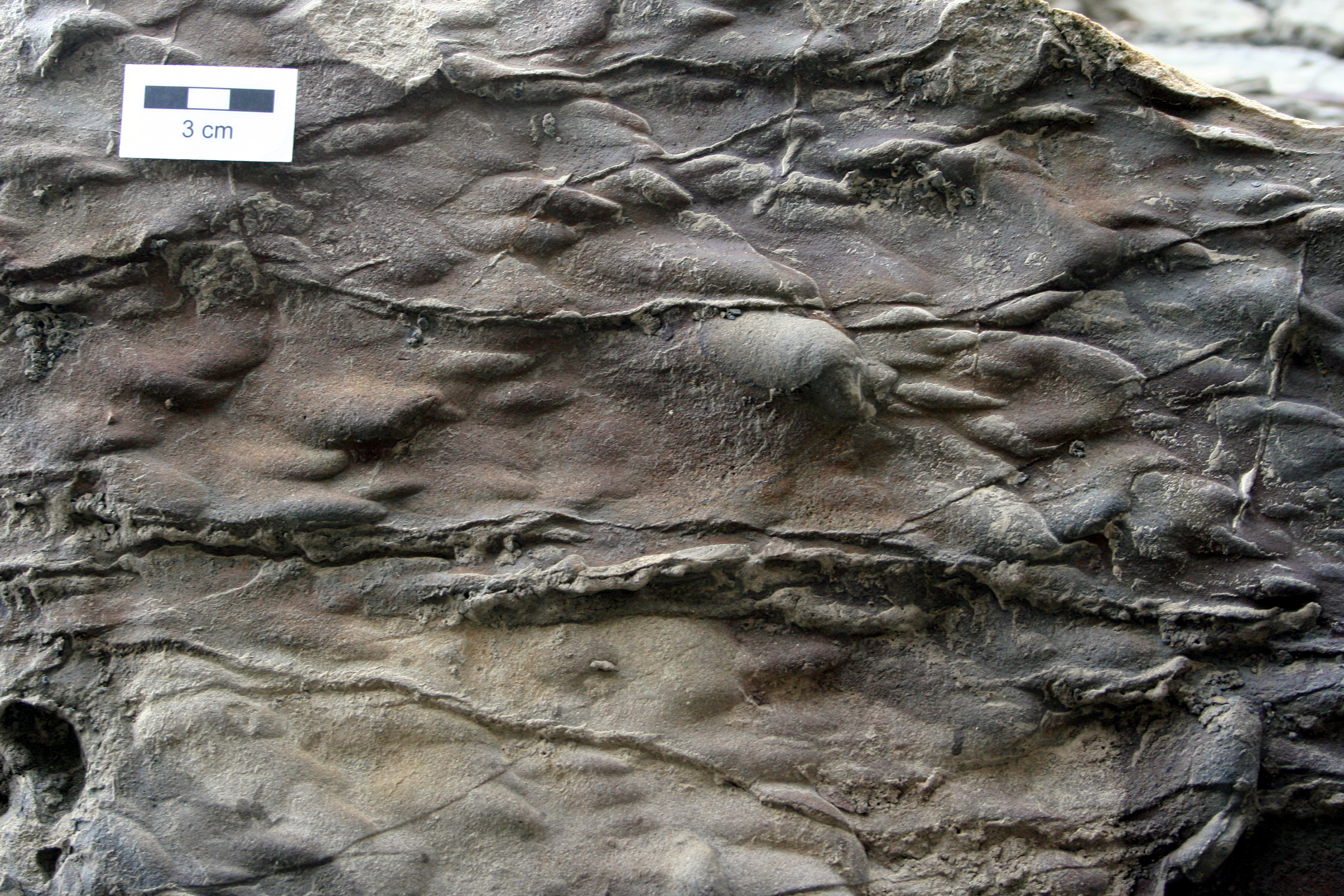
Flute casts on the base of a bed of sandstone from the Inverness Formation, western Cape Breton Island, Nova Scotia

Sole marks are sedimentary structures found on the bases of certain strata, that indicate small-scale (usually on the order of centimetres) grooves or irregularities. This usually occurs at the interface of two differing lithologies and/or grain sizes. They are commonly preserved as casts of these indents on the bottom of the overlying bed (like flute casts). This is similar to casts and molds in fossil preservation. Occurring as they do only at the bottom of beds, and their distinctive shapes, they can make useful way up structures and paleocurrent indicators.

Sole markings are found most commonly in turbidite deposits, but are also often seen in modern river beds and tidal channels.

== History ==
Sole markings were first recognized in the Devonian rocks of New York State by James Hall in 1843. Originally, the features found on the undersides of beds were called hieroglyphs, fucoids, and bio hieroglyphs, because of their structure and how they were thought to be created; however, the term sole mark is used by geologists at present.

== Scour marks and flute casts ==
Scour marks and flute casts are scours dug into soft, fine sediment which typically get filled by an overlying bed (hence the name cast). Measuring the long axis of the flute cast gives the direction of flow, with the tapered end pointing toward the flow and the steep end up current. The concavity of the flute cast also points stratigraphically up. Flute casts can be characterized into four types, parabolic, spindle-shaped, comet-shaped, and asymmetrical.

- Parabolic flute casts are the most common and simple form. The shape of the bulbous end is parabolic or rounded shape and rarely shows any asymmetrical behavior. They occur in groups or individually, and all move parallel to each other and to paleoflow. In any given environment, their width and length will be consistent and range from a few centimeters, up to one meter in length.

- Spindle-shaped flute casts are found singularly or in groups, are considerably longer than they are wide and have pointed bulbous ends and are generally five to fifteen centimeters long. They can be quite shallow or as much as two thirds of the width in depth. These structures are easily definable because they lack symmetry parallel to the flow direction.

- Comet-shaped flute casts are characteristically found in isolation, and have a sharply pointed bulbous end, but the shallower end shows no stable continuous path. The overall length of the comet-shaped flute is rarely longer than ten centimeters, and the imprints are generally shallow.

- Asymmetrical flute casts are formed on top of a neighboring cast, and, therefore, covers half or more of the underlying flute. As the flutes continue to build outward in a step-like fashion and cut into each other, they get smaller and shallower.

== Tool marks ==
Tool marks are a type of sole marking formed by grooves left in a bed by things like sticks being dragged along by a current. The average direction of these can be assumed to be the flow direction, though it is bidirectional, so it could be either way along the mark. Tool marks also have a more specific breakdown. There are grooves and striations, skip or prod marks, and roll marks. Groove or striation marks result from the continuous contact with the muddy bed. Skip or prod marks come from objects that bounce along the surface of the muddy bed. And roll marks result from objects rolling along the muddy bed.

- A skip mark is part of a series of linear tool marks left by an object that skipped along the bottom of a stream by saltation. Skip marks are characterized by their even spacing and the crescent-shaped mark that is left on the bed. The skip marks run parallel to paleoflow.

- Saltation is a method of sediment transport that briefly suspends particles and then drops them creating a forward bouncing pattern. This occurs because the turbulent currents are not strong enough to maintain suspension of the particles, but strong enough to suspend the particle for short bursts of time before the particle is returned to the sediment surface and bounces off again.

- A prod mark is a relatively short tool mark caused by an object that was dug into the muddy sediment and then lifted out. These markings are generally asymmetrical, getting deeper down current, and end suddenly.

- Roll marks are made by an object that was forced to roll down the bottom of a stream. The marks made in this case are continuous, long, generally linear, and run parallel to the paleoflow. The width dimensions of roll marks vary based upon the size of the object. Roll marks are a sign of water that has enough energy to cause motion but not enough turbidity and energy to separate the object from the bottom of a muddy bed.

== Groove casts ==
Groove casts are straight parallel ridges that are raised a few millimeters from the bedding surface. These structures were named and defined by Shrock in 1948 because of their long and narrow appearance, and they were formed from the filling in of grooves. Even though they may seem similar to flute casts, they each have many distinguishing characteristics, and the two are generally not found in the same vicinity. Groove casts are closely spaced, but not on top of each other, and exist in pairs, triples, and even larger groups. Groove casts form when high velocity flows (e.g. turbidite) create a pattern on an underlying bed. In 1957, Kuenen published that "groove cast" was a general term encompassing both drag marks and slide marks.

- A slide mark is a long, relatively wide, but shallow gouge left in a muddy bed caused by sliding of a soft-body object such as a bed of algae or slumping of sediment.

- Drag marks are narrower and deeper than slide marks, but retain the same length. Drag marks create a groove or striation caused by a physically hard object like a rock or shell.

== Load casts ==
Load casts are secondary structures that are preserved as bulbous depressions on the base of a bed. They form as dense, overlying sediment (usually sand) settles into less dense, water-saturated sediment (usually mud) below.
