= Flame structure =

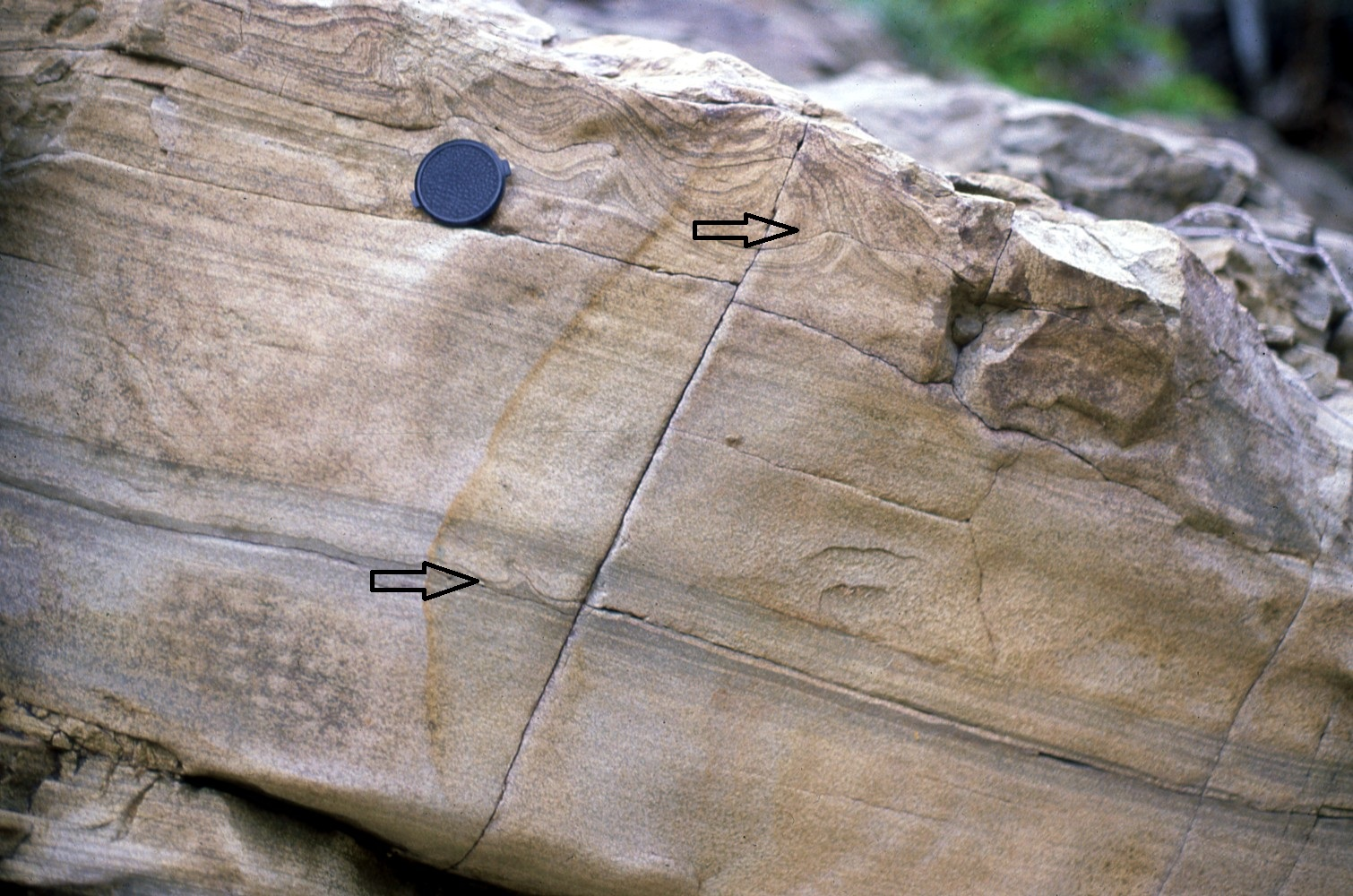
Flame structures in a sandy turbidite. Cozy Dell Formation, Topatopa Mountains, California.

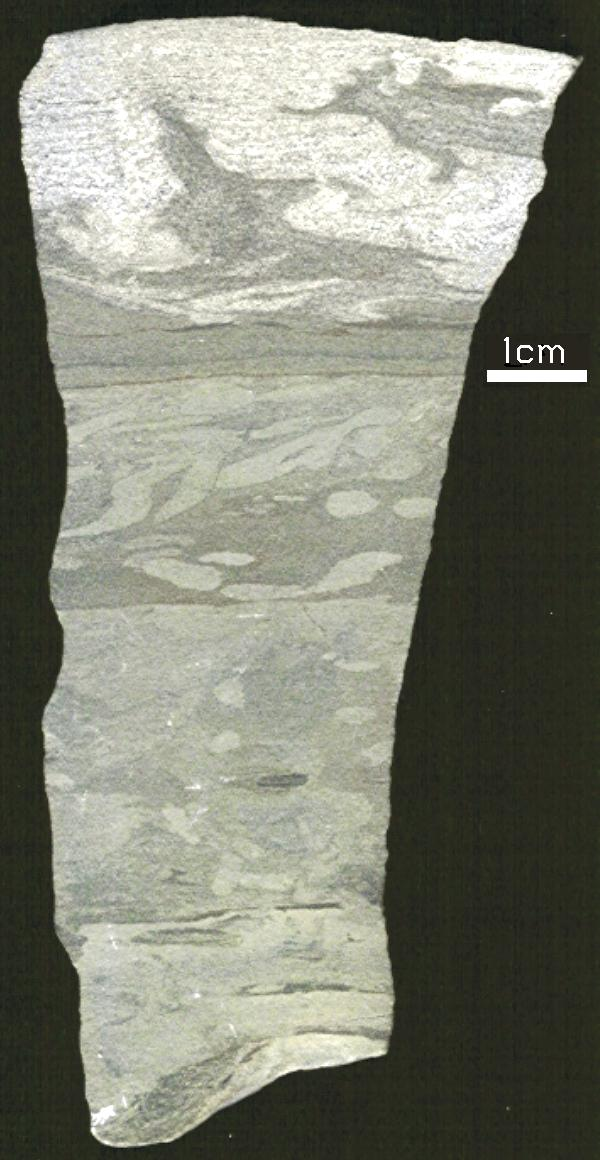
Section of hand sample of dolomitic siltstone showing a flame structure at top. From I-71, exit 28, Kentucky. Probably Upper Ordovician Saluda Dolomite.

A flame structure is a type of soft-sediment deformation that forms in unconsolidated sediments. The weight of an overlying bed forces an underlying bed to push up through the overlying bed, generally when both strata are saturated with water. The resulting pattern (in cross section) may resemble flames. In order for the flame structure to occur, the overlying bed must be of a higher density than the underlying bed, or there must be differential pressures in the upper bed.

Basically prior to flaming these structures are unstable, under pressure, and then subject to additional stress, such as being triggered by earthquakes. Earthquakes over magnitude 6 can initiate flaming in large (hundreds to thousands of square kilometres) areas, but flaming can also be caused by as little as the repeated pounding of waves.
