= Cyclic steps =

Type of sediment wave

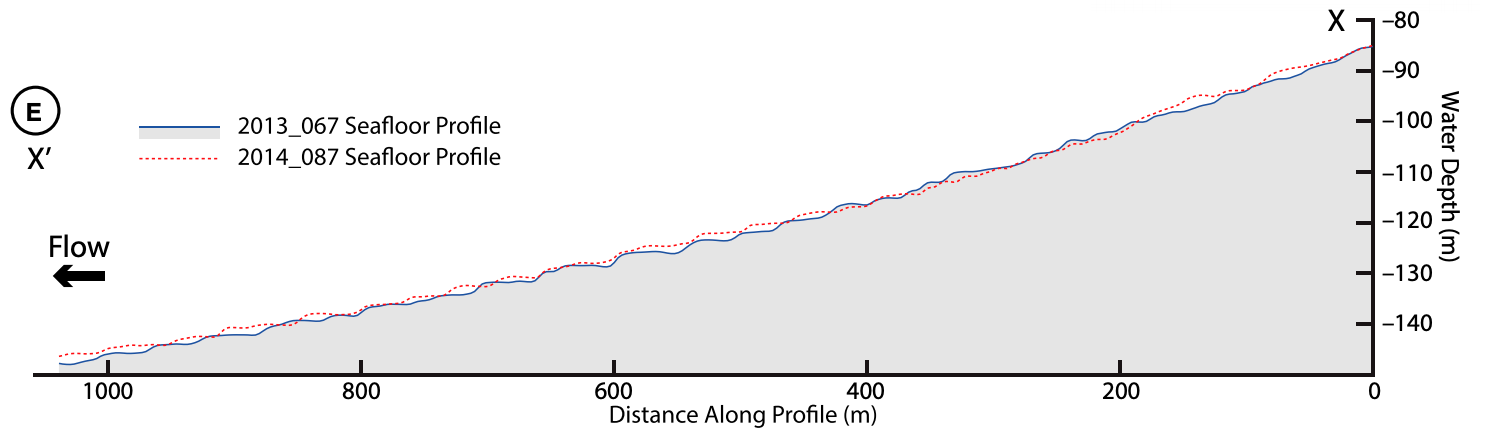
A profile view of cyclic steps in Monterey Canyon

Cyclic steps are rhythmic bedforms associated with Froude super-critical flow instability. They are a type of sediment wave, and are created when supercritical sediment-laden water (turbidity currents) travels downslope through sediment beds. Each "step" has a steep drop, and together they tend to migrate upstream. On the ocean floor, this phenomenon was first shown to be possible in 2006, although it was observed in open-channel flows over a decade earlier. Geological features appearing to be submarine cyclic steps have been detected in the northern lowlands of Mars in the Aeolis Mensae region, providing evidence of an ancient Martian ocean.

== Formation ==
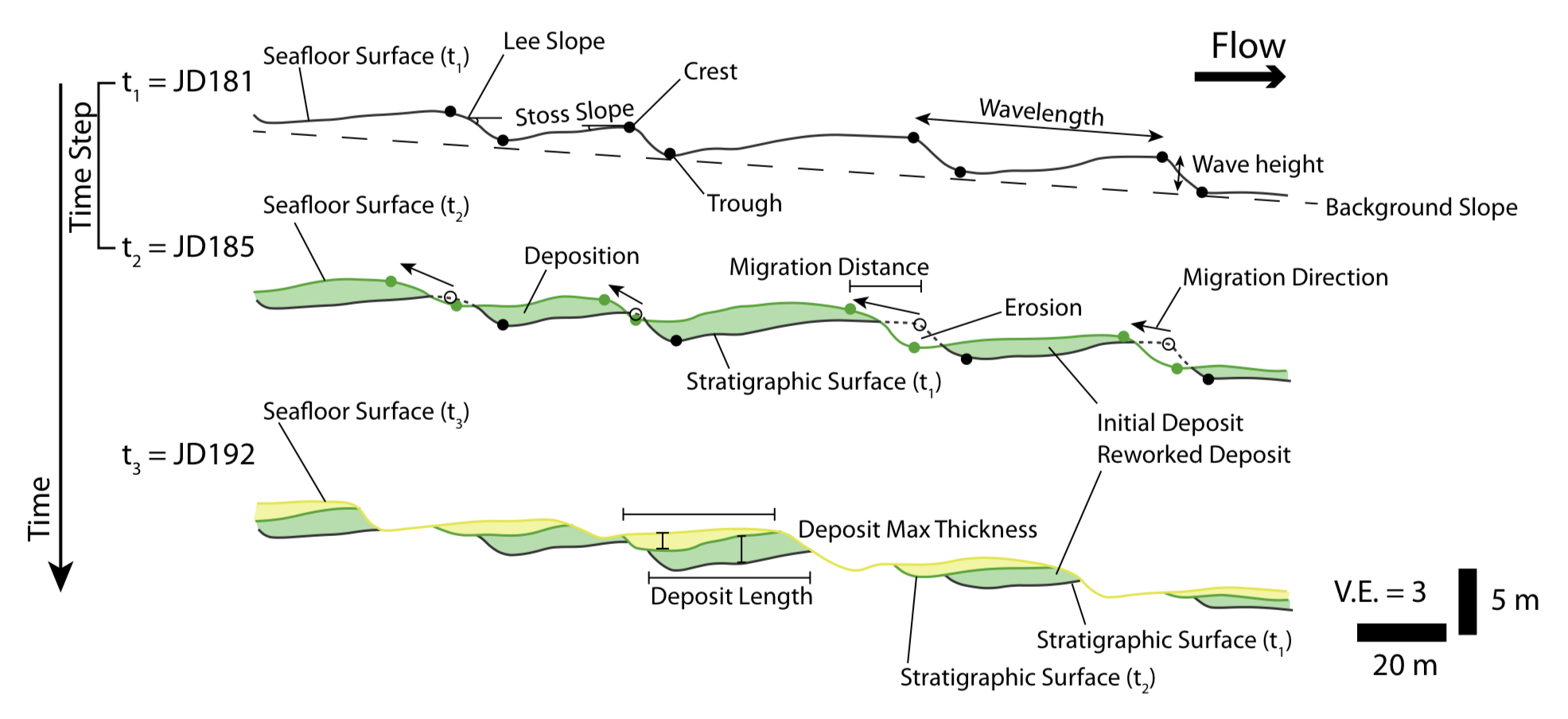
Cyclic step formation over time

There are many parameters which govern the formation of cyclic steps: bed slope, bed porosity, erosion resistance, sediment concentration, and flow rate all play a role. Tilting flumes can be used to create cyclic steps in subaerial laboratory conditions, provided the Froude number is high enough. If the Froude number is lower than required, then antidunes will form instead. Additionally, if the sediment is too fine, then chute-and-pool features will form. In subaqueous conditions, most of the work has traditionally been in building mathematical, rather than physical, models of cyclic step formation. However, cyclic steps have attracted increasing scientific attention in the past decade, and numerous real-world examples of cyclic steps have been found.

Cyclic steps can be categorized by the rate at which sediment is deposited (the aggradation rate) on different parts of the steps. The categorization concerns the difference in rate on the stoss (flow-facing) and lee (flow-opposing) sides of the feature. Type-1 cyclic steps have more lee erosion than there is stoss aggradation, Type-2 have a roughly equal amount of lee erosion and stoss aggradation, and Type-3 has aggradation on both sides. Type-1 cyclic steps play an important role in canyon formation. Type-2 cyclic steps have been created in the laboratory, in contrast to Type-3 which is common on the sea floor but is harder to create in laboratory conditions – it was first made experimentally in 2013. Types 1, 2, and 3 are also called "falling", "transportational", and "climbing", respectively. Laboratory work has successfully created all three types of cyclic steps in open-channel flows.

== Relation to other bedforms ==
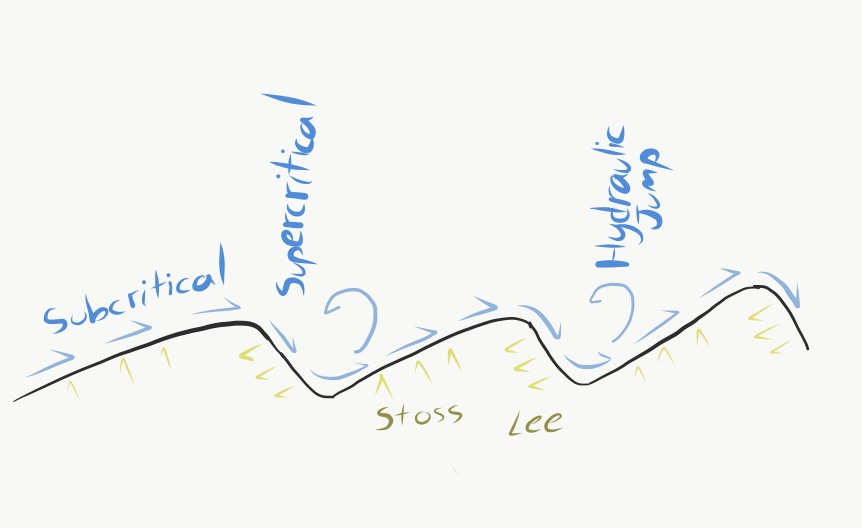
Cyclic steps. Super/subcritical refers to Froude number, blue arrows to fluid flow, and beige arrows to motion of bedform due to erosion/deposition.

In density flows, antidunes can turn into cyclic steps by wave breaking. Fluid flow is Froude-supercritical over the entirety of antidunes, whereas the flow alternates between the sub- and super-criticality over cyclic steps (with hydraulic jumps between cycles). Additionally, cyclic steps tend to have a much larger wavelength-to-flow-thickness ratio and a higher suspension index (ratio of shear velocity to sediment settling velocity). Antidunes are typically unstable (although they can be made stable in laboratory conditions), in contrast to cyclic steps. Despite these differences, it is not uncommon for researchers to incorrectly label a cyclic step as an antidune. Cyclic steps also have similarities to chute-and-pool features. Like cyclic steps, chute-and-pool flows undergo hydraulic jumps, although the flow does not undergo repeated transitions from sub- to super-critical. When the flow remains subcritical over the whole feature, ripples and dunes form instead.

== Examples ==
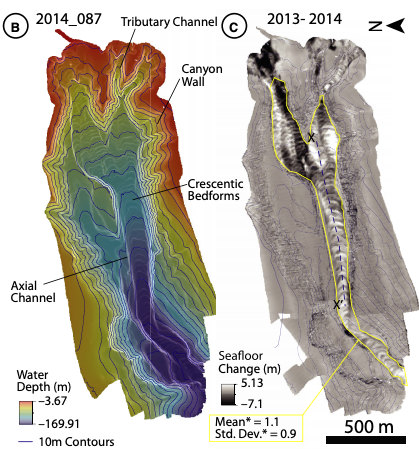
Cyclic steps at Monterey Canyon

Attention on real-world cyclic steps has mostly been focused on the ocean floor and at river deltas. Several submarine cyclic steps have been discovered off the coast of California, such as those in the underwater canyons Monterey Canyon and Eel Canyon. They have also been discovered in the South China Sea, at the South Taiwan shoal and the West Penghu submarine canyons. The cyclic step structure at the South Taiwan shoal is the longest ever observed (as of 2015), consisting of 19 steps and ranging over 100 kilometres (62 mi). They have also been discovered in the Japan Sea at the Toyama deep-sea channel. On Mars, they have been observed at Aeolis Mensae. At prodeltas (the portion of a river delta furthest from shore), cyclic steps have been observed in the Mediterranean. The wavelength of prodelta cyclic steps tends to be an order of magnitude smaller than their seafloor counterparts; the Mediterranean cyclic steps have a wavelength ranging from 20 to 100 metres (66 to 328 ft) whereas submarine cyclic steps are typically measured in kilometers.

While no modern examples have been found, cyclic steps can also form within rivers. Geologic evidence from the Cambrian-Ordovician Potsdam Group strata indicates that the Quebec Basin once possessed this type of cyclic step. Glaciolacustrine cyclic steps have also been found in modern Quebec. Cyclic steps can also form along underwater volcanos, such as those in the Punta del Rosario fan, as well as along carbonate slopes and under bedrock streams. Cyclic steps do not need to form underwater – wind can cause them too. Katabatic winds may have caused cyclic steps to form on the ice sheet of Antarctica, and are actively forming cyclic steps at Mars’ poles.
