= Aeolis Mensae =

Tableland feature on Mars

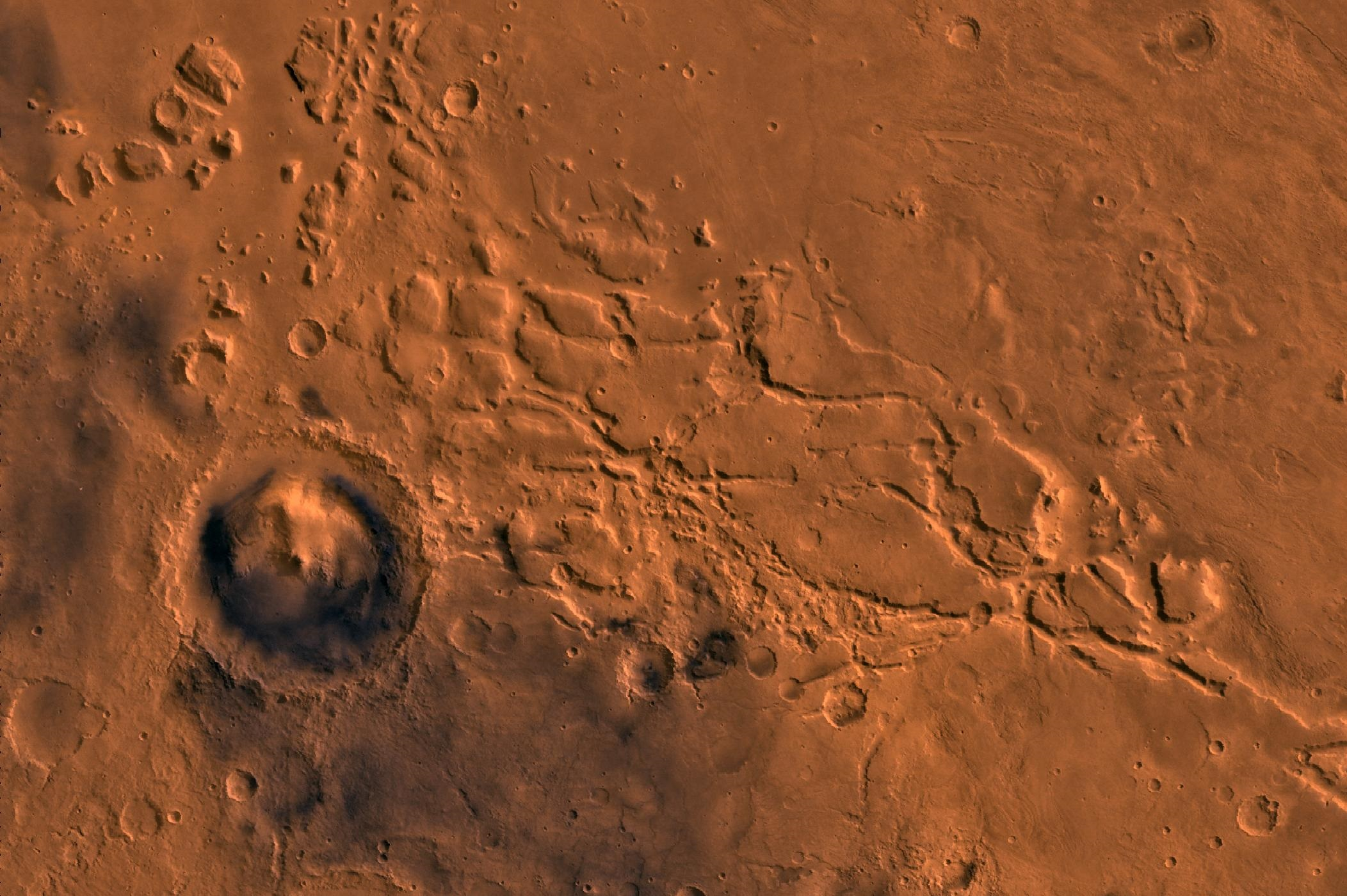
- Aeolis Mensae is the large diagonal feature in the image, to the north and east of the crater (Gale crater).
- Coordinates: 2.9°S 219.6°W

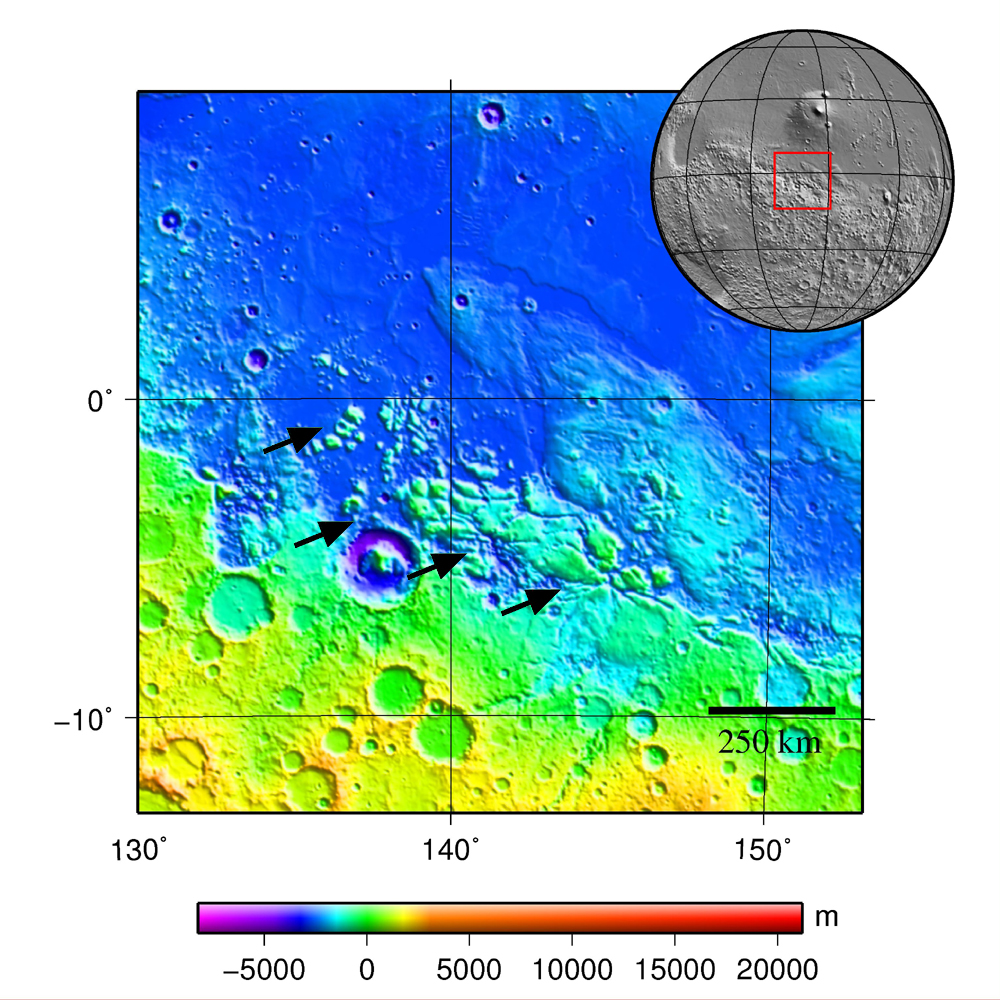
Aeolis Mensae

Aeolis Mensae is a tableland feature in the northwest Aeolis quadrangle of Mars. Its location is centered at 2.9° south latitude and 219.6° west longitude, in the transition zone between the Martian highlands and lowlands. It is 820 kilometres (510 mi) long and was named after a classical albedo feature (Aeolis). The constituent mensae can be as long as 70 kilometres (43 mi) and as tall as 2 kilometres (1.2 mi). It is notable for being the origin of an abnormal concentration of methane detected by Curiosity in 2019, although its geology has attracted scientific attention since at least a decade before this event. Aeolis Mensae is also the first region in Mars where submarine cyclic steps, an erosion feature that gives evidence of an ancient ocean, were identified.

== Observation history ==
It was named in 1976, and examined in detail by Mars Express's HRSC camera in 2007. The Curiosity rover landed in the neighboring Gale Crater in 2012, and since then the area has received limited but continued attention from both ESA's HRSC and NASA's HiRISE cameras in orbit. In 2019, it was determined that Curiosity had detected methane originating from this region.

Due to the wealth of information coming from Curiosity about the local region, as well as the suspected presence of subsurface water, nitrates, aluminum, and iron, Aeolis Mensae has been considered as a candidate for a Martian habitat as early as 2016.

== Context ==
To Aeolis Mensae's south and west is Gale Crater, with the site of Curiosity rover's landing at Aeolis Pallus being between it and Mount Sharp (Aeolis Mons). Aeolis Mensae lies in the northwest corner of the Aeolis quadrangle, and thus the adjacent features lie in all four nearby quadrangles. Remaining in the Aeolis quadrangle, Aeolis Planum runs alongside northeastern edge of Aeolis Mensae. In the Tyrrhenum quadrangle, Robert Sharp Crater lies to Aeolis Mensae's west. Aeolis Mensae lies on the transition between Elysium Planitia (north, Elysium quadrangle) and Terra Cimmeria (south). The next geological figure along the transition zone, to Aeolis Mensae's northwest, is Nepenthes Menthae in the Amenthes quadrangle. This transition zone marks the boundary between the Martian highlands and lowlands, one of the defining features of the planet.

The linear escarpments mark the boundary between plains and plateau materials, and are parallel to fault lines in Elysium Planitia (such as Cerberus Fossae). These escarpments run northwest, although in the northeast direction there are also fractures which have split smaller mensae off of the main plateau.

=== Maps ===
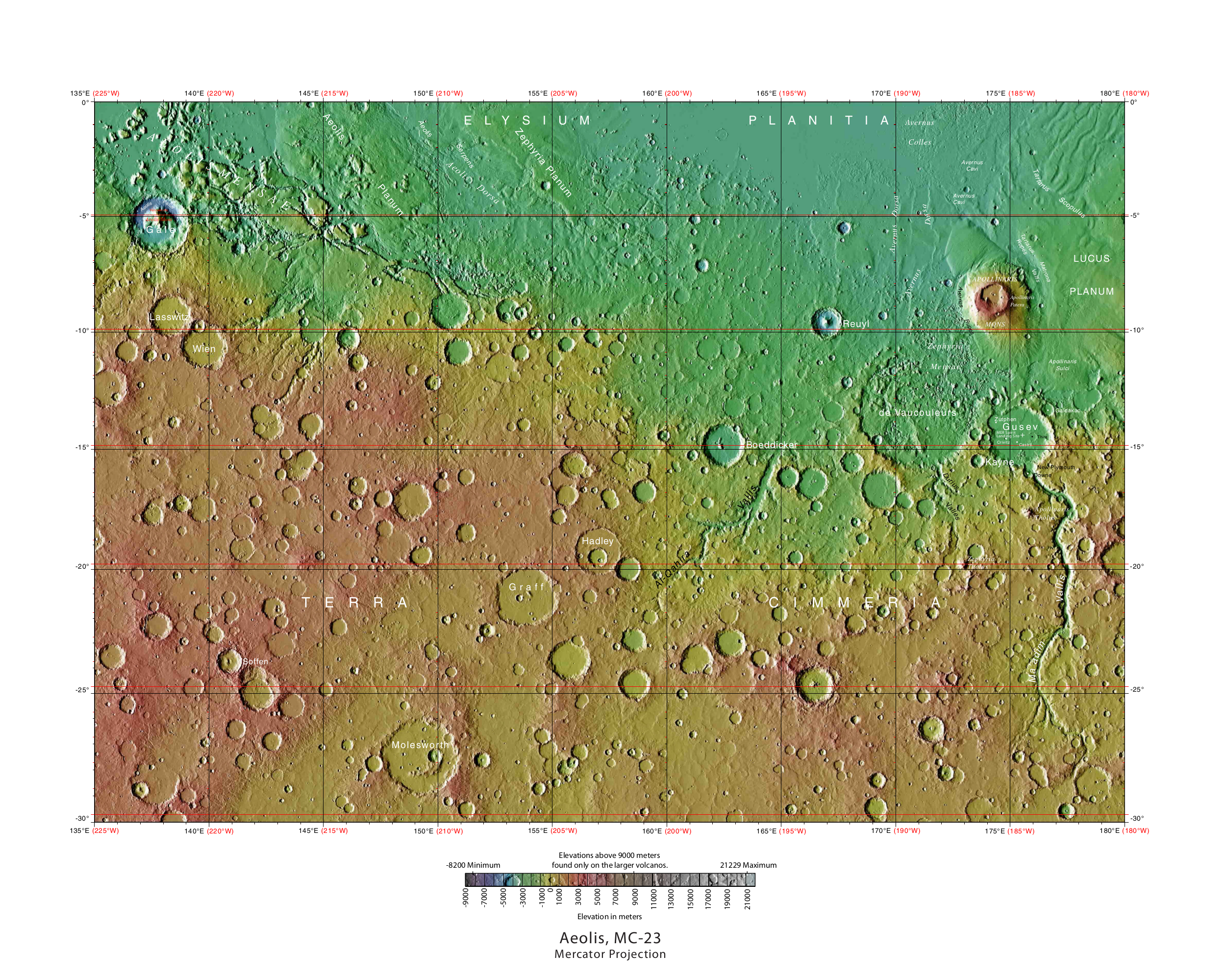
Aeolis Mensae can be found in the northwestern corner of the Aeolis quadrangle.

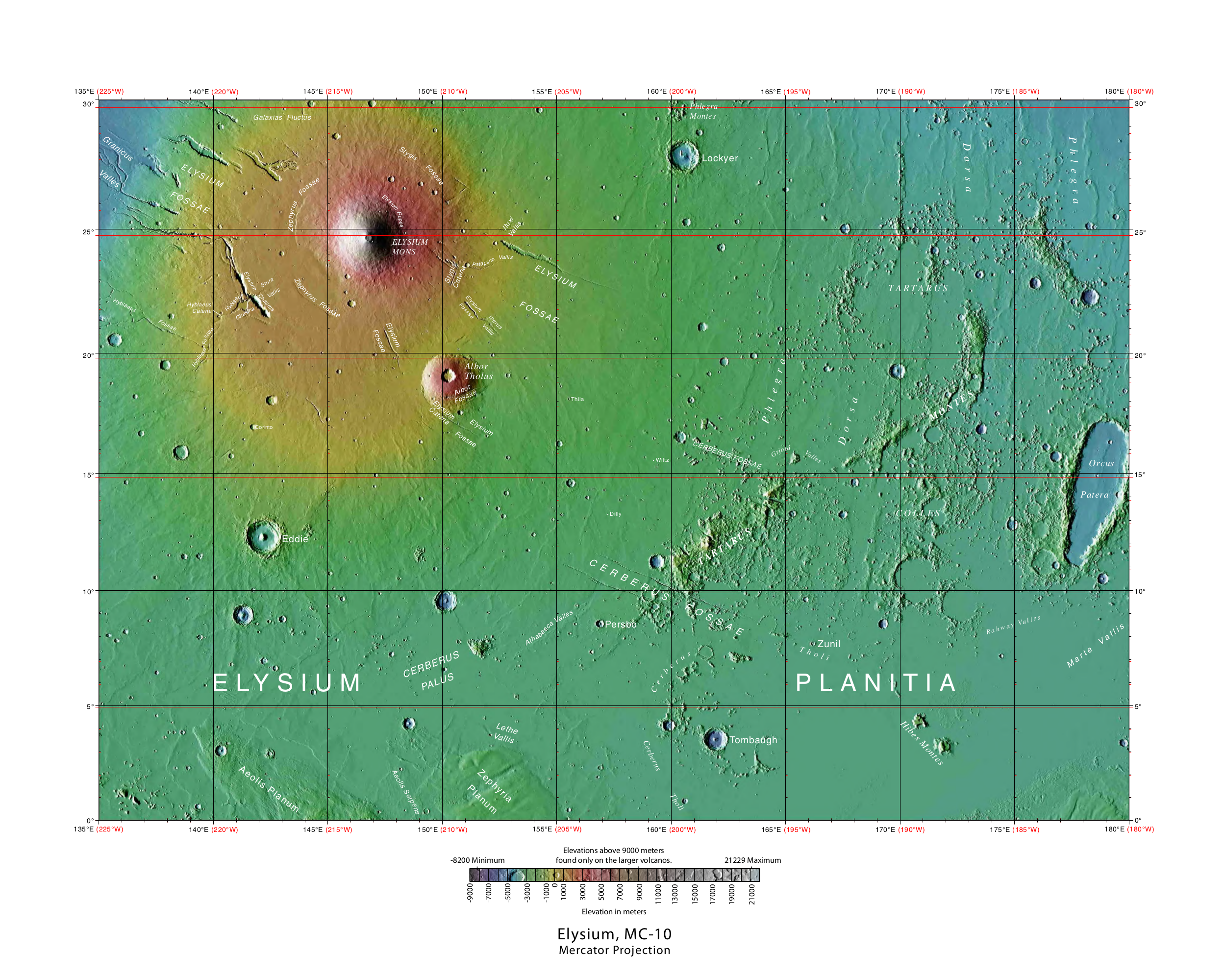
Aeolis Mensae does not quite extend into the Elysium quadrangle, but many of its neighbors do. it is just to the south of the western portion of this map.

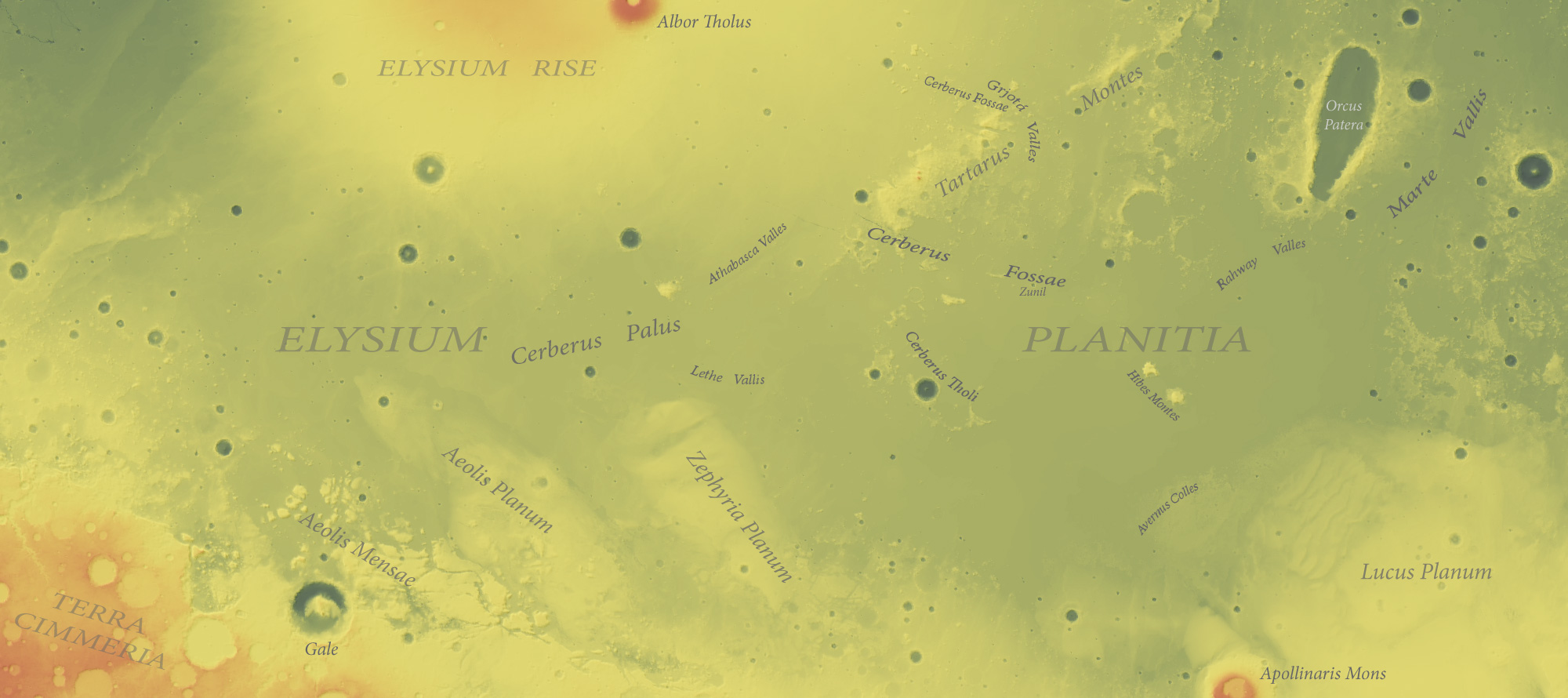
Another view of Aeolis Mensae (southwest), which gives a better picture of its surroundings to the north and west.

== Relevance in the search for life on Mars ==
A study from 2019 showed that the area of Aeolis Mensae is the most likely source of methane which was previously detected by Curiosity. While Martian methane levels are known to fluctuate seasonally, the spike of methane observed by Curiosity cannot be explained by this. The exact cause of the spike is unknown; possible hypotheses suggest either a geological or biological origin.

Aeolis Mensae is thought to have possessed an aquifer which was, along with the Elysium Planitia basin, a source of water for a lake in Gale Crater during the Amazonian period of Mars' development.

== Geology ==
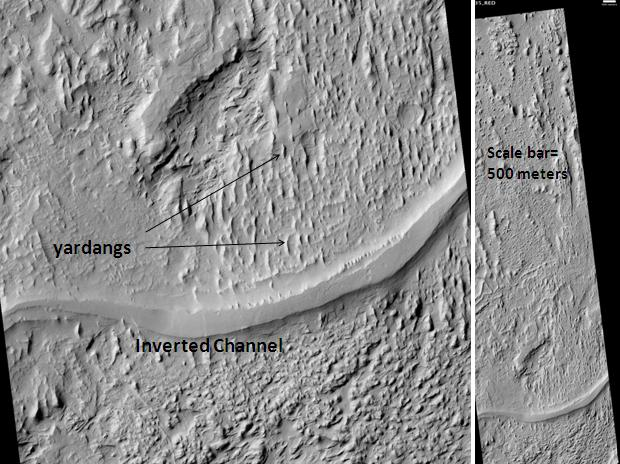
Aeolis Mensae yardangs, as seen by HiRISE. Scale bar is 500 meters long. Click on image for better view of yardangs.

The surfaces of the mesas are between 3.5 and 3.7 billion years old. This is in contrast to the materials on the valley floors, which are at least 600 million years old. These ages were derived from crater-counting methods; the valley floors have been subject to much resurfacing and thus some craters may have been eroded. This would make the 600 million year estimate an underestimate; the valleys may have been carved earlier.

The valleys of Aeolis Mensae resemble glacial grooves on Earth, however tectonic activity is thought to be a better explanation for their formation. Lava flows are also expected to explain some of the features in the region, however in 2018 it was shown that the long-held conception that Aeolis Mensae was a flood-volcanic province was in fundamental error - volcanism cannot explain all of the features present at Aeolis Mensae. The Aeolis quadrangle is known for having wind-related features - the yardangs are an example of this. Water erosion has also played a role in the formation of features in the region.

There are multiple competing theories about the origin of the fretted terrain. One hypothesis states that it was formed during the late Noachian period of Mars' development, via wind erosion. However, more recent studies favor an explanation in which Hesperian-aged glaciers, 1.5 to 2.5 kilometres (0.93 to 1.55 mi) in height, were the cause of this terrain. The shape of the valleys of Aeolis Mensae support the latter hypothesis; they tend to be u-shaped rather than v-shaped, which indicates a period of glaciation in the past. U-shaped valleys may also be explained by sapping, although this would not explain other (glacier-indicating) features such as the system of concentric lobate ridges and the presence of cirques. Aeolis Mensae lack the lineated valley fill and lobate debris apron features, features present at many other fretted terrains. The presence of these features would indicate a Late Amazonian glacial origin. A fluvial origin of the valleys is unlikely, due to the low number of tributaries among other factors.

Compared to other Martian mensae, such as Nilosyrtis Mensae, Aeolis Mensae has more frequent landslides. Traditional explanations, such as having unstable slopes or being near a volcanically active region, do not apply. Aeolis Mensae's landsides occur at high frequency on relatively stable slopes, and it is located more than 500 kilometres (310 mi) from the volcanic region of Elysium Mons - this is farther than the largest distance that any volcanic region on Earth has induced landslides over. This implies the feature may be partially made of volcanic ash, which would make sliding more likely. Aeolis Mensae is thought to have a composition more similar to Medussa Fossae than the highlands; Medussa Fossae is also expected to be made out of ash and other friable materials.

Aeolis Mensae contains inverted reliefs - these are instances in which a stream bed is a raised feature (instead of a valley). The inversion may be caused by the deposition of large rocks or by cementation. In either case erosion lowered the surrounding land, but left the old channel as a raised ridge due to the stream bed's resistance to erosion. An image taken by HiRISE shows a ridge that may be old channels that have become inverted. Despite this evidence of a wet history, most erosion caused by ancient rivers is expected to have been completely masked by other erosive forces from later on in Mars' geologic history. Large scale fluvial features still remain, however; the path of ancient rivers has cut oxbows into the mensae.

=== Aeolis Mensae Deltas ===
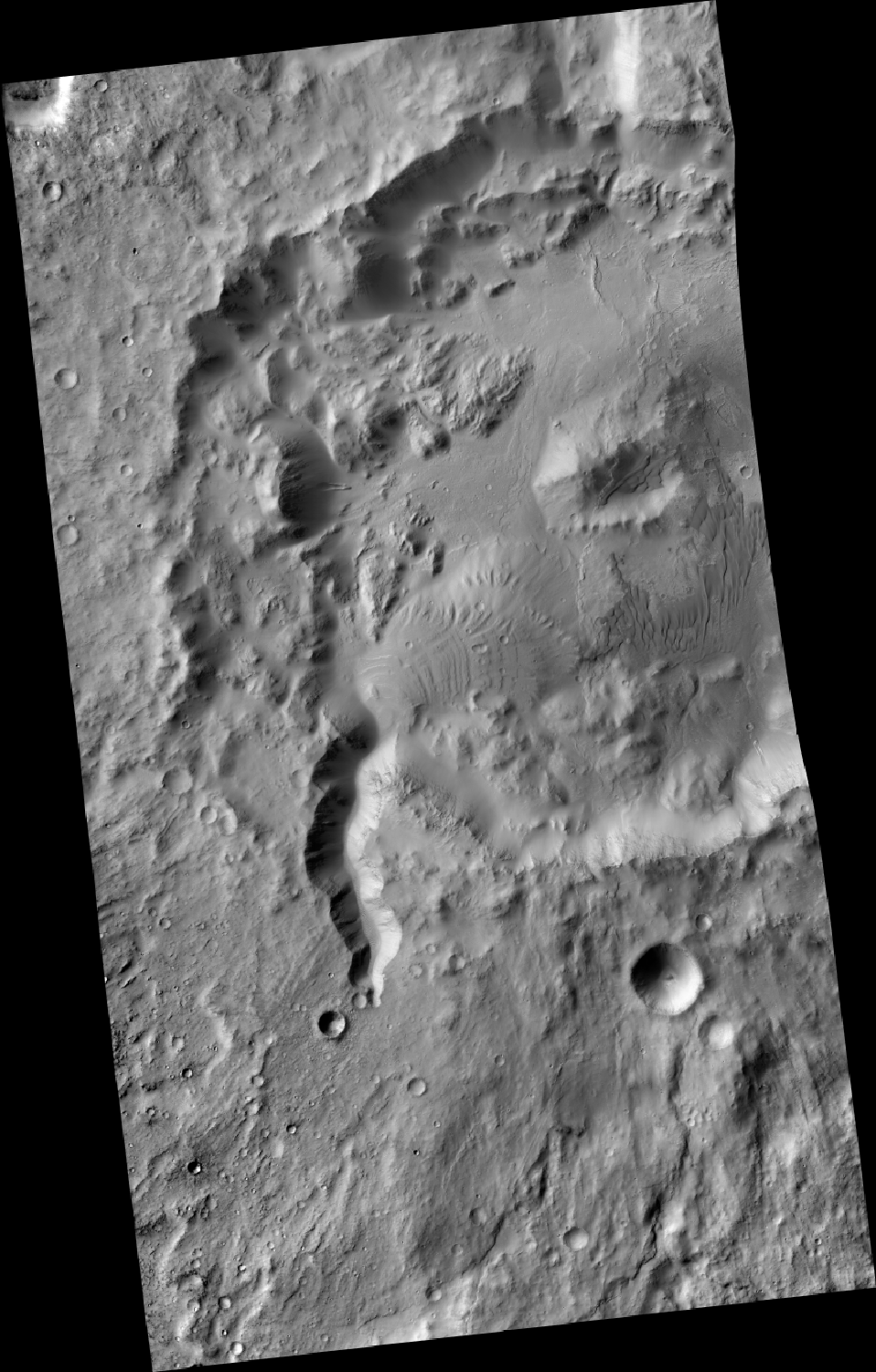
Aeolis Mensae Delta 2 (just north of the large canyon leading into the crater).

There are at least 4 deltas at Aeolis Mensae. The first three have been numbered 1 through 3 and were investigated by Hauber et al. All three drain from south to north, and are fed by deep canyons that lack tributaries. Aeolis Mensae Delta 1 (5.62°S 140.49°E, henceforth just Delta 1) was formed approximately 1 billion years ago, and Delta 3 (6.49°S 141.69°E) was formed approximately 0.47 billion years ago. Delta 2 (6.54°S 141.12°E) is much older; while the upper lobe is only 0.4 billion years old, the lower lobe is approximately 3.46 billion years old. The deltas are suspected to have formed in short bursts; the lack of minerals formed in the presence of water indicates that the rivers were not sustained over long periods. The water is thought to have originated from local ice rather than groundwater or precipitation.

The fourth delta, known simply as Aeolis Mensae Delta (5.149°S 132.681°E), is an ancient delta near Aeolis Mensae proper and Robert Sharp Crater. Deltas naturally move over their lifetime due to erosion, but this motion was blocked by the mensae of Aeolis Mensae. This delta is of scientific interest as it provides strong evidence of an ancient lowlands ocean in Mars' northern hemisphere, by way of submarine cyclic steps. Submarine cyclic steps are "rhythmic, upstream-migrating bedforms bounded by internal hydraulic jumps in overriding turbidity currents" according to Kostic and Parker. They occur on the ocean floor on Earth, and thus their existence on Mars implies the existence of an ocean which produced them. However, (non-submarine) cyclic steps can form due to wind-related erosion instead, as is the case for some features in the Martian polar ice caps.

== Images by NASA and ESA ==
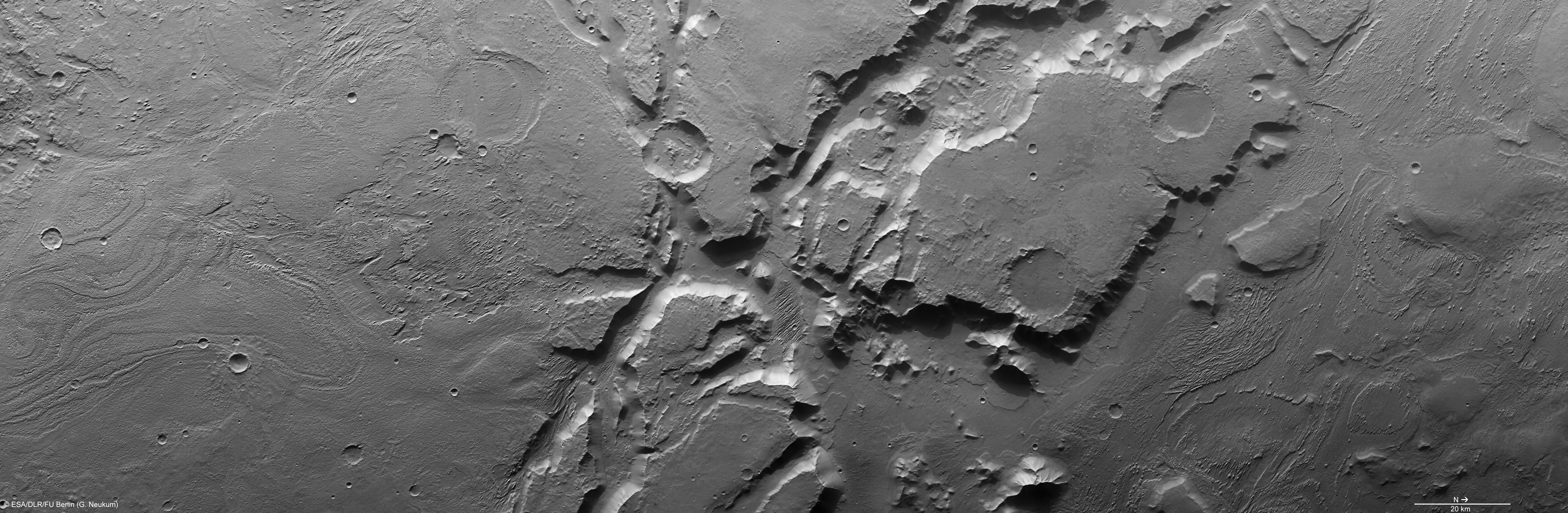
High resolution; taken by Mars Express' High Resolution Stereo Camera (HRSC).

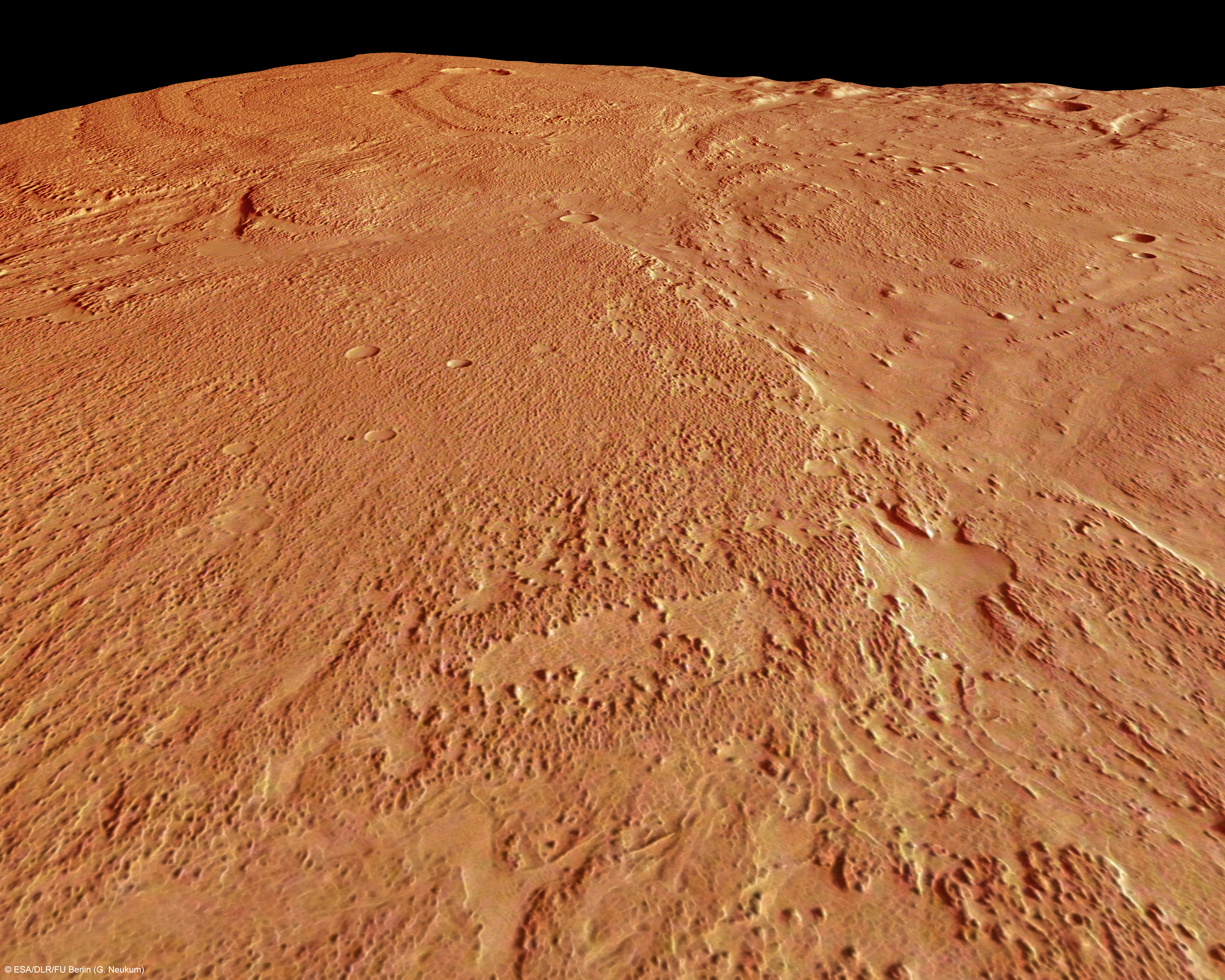
An image of the south of Aeolis Mensae, taken by HRSC

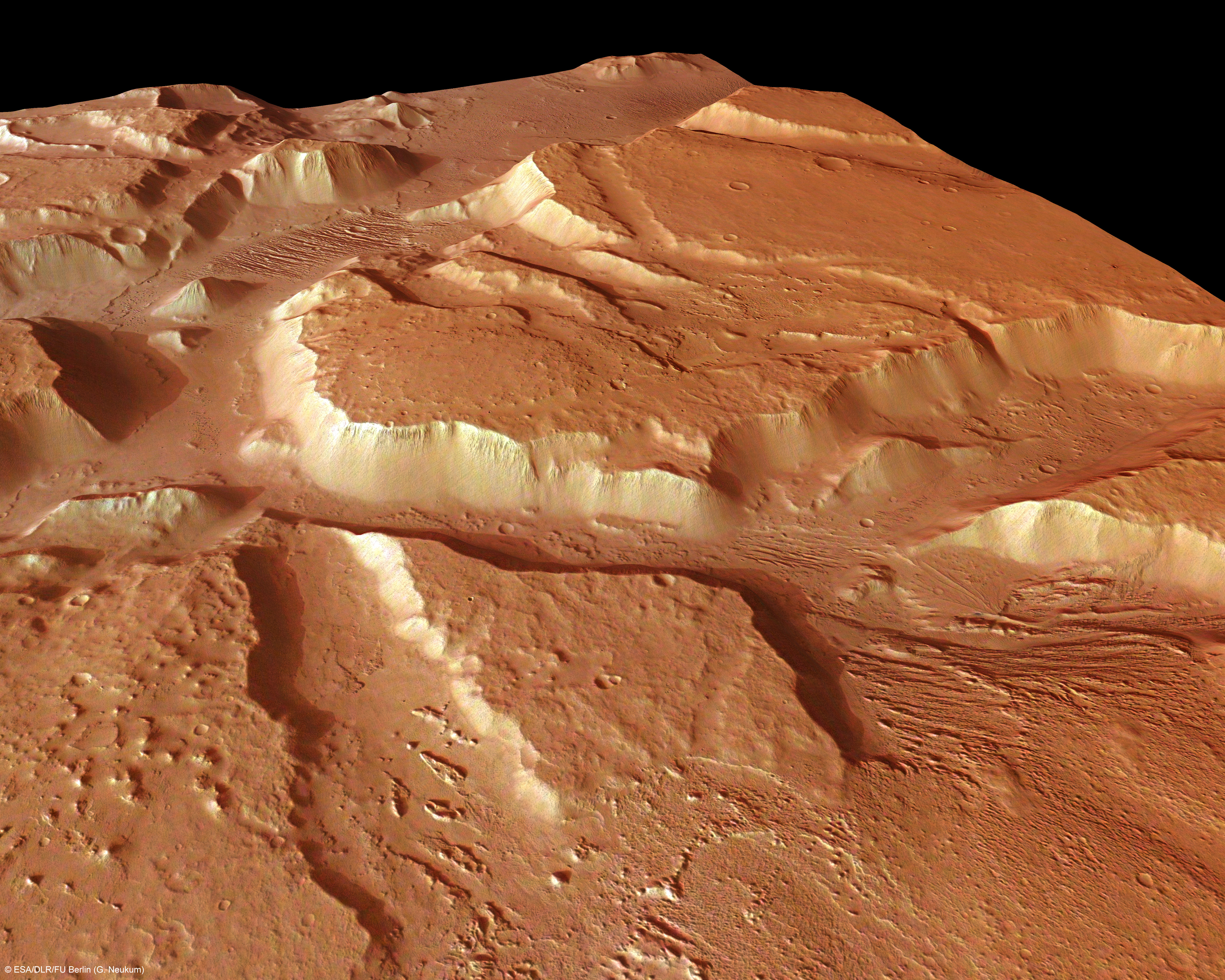
An image of the north of Aeolis Mensae, by HRSC

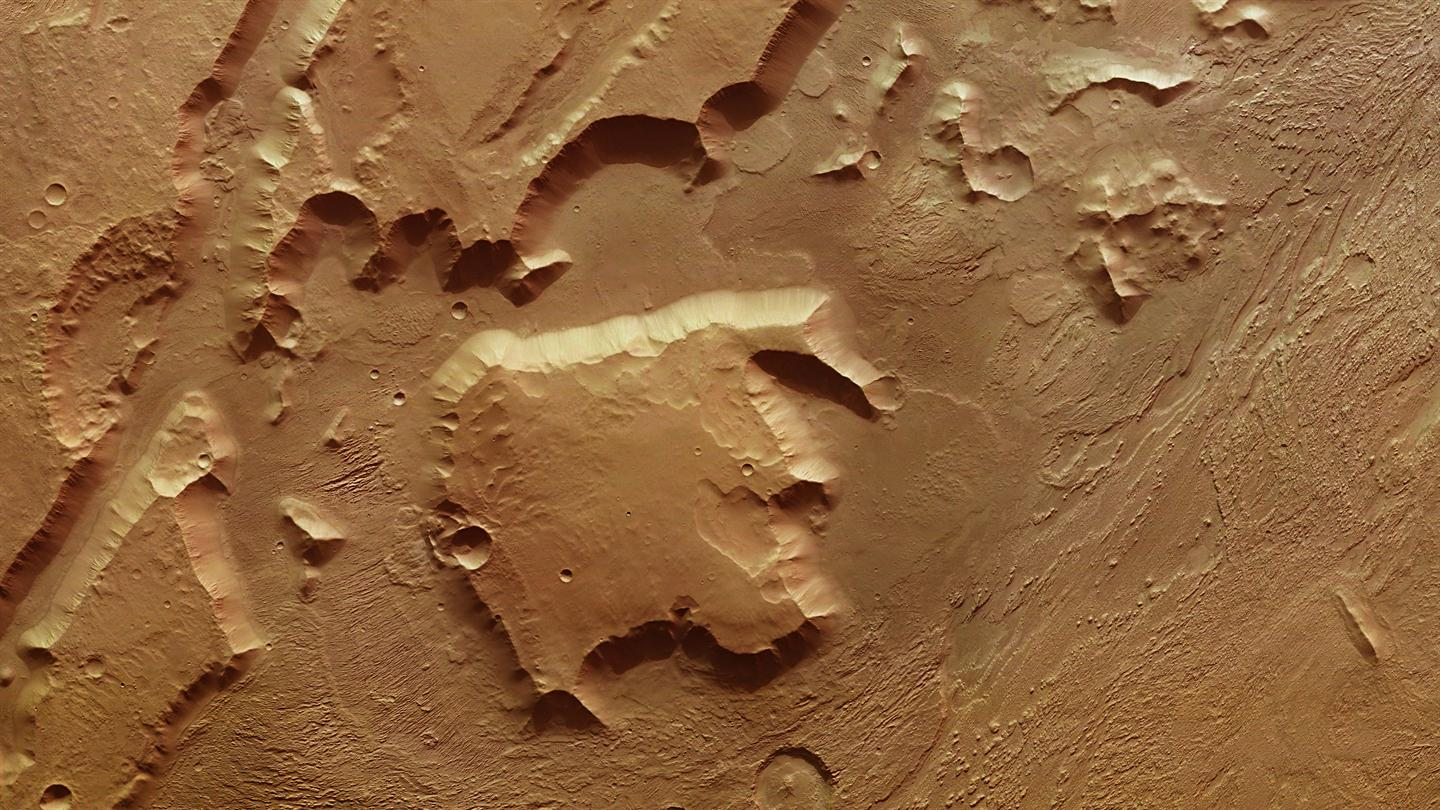
The large block in this image was separated from the nearby elevated areas by tectonic activity in Mars' past.

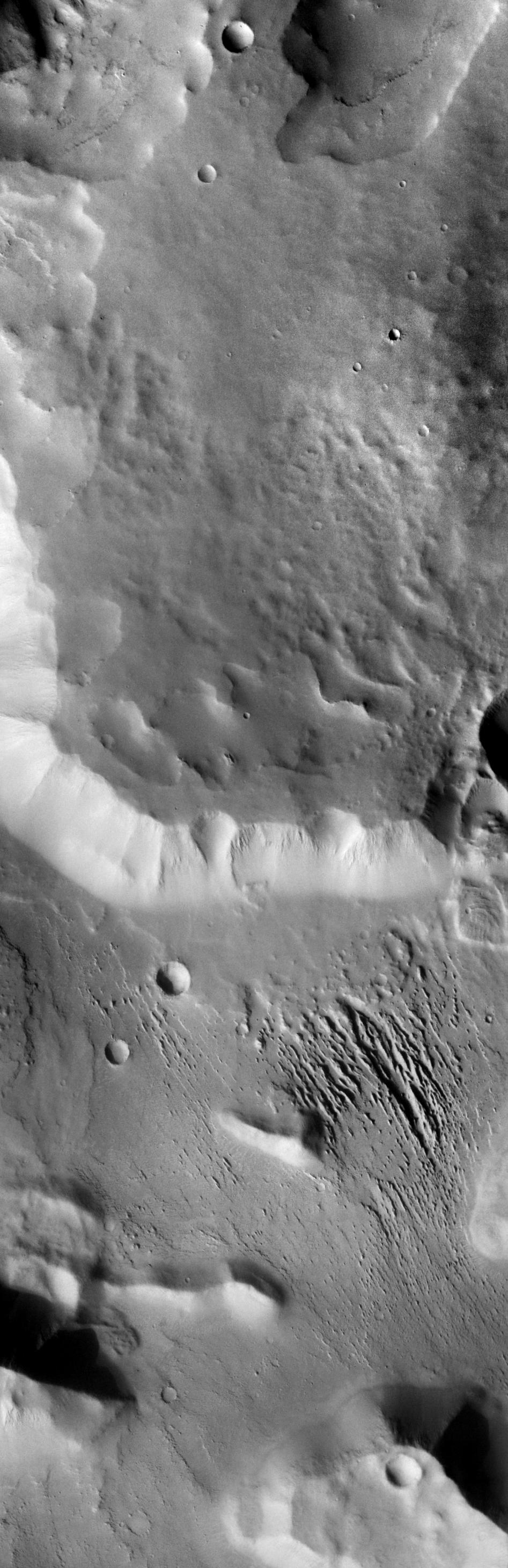
Canyons of Aeolis Mensae.
