= Turbidity current =

Underwater current of sediment-laden water moving downslope

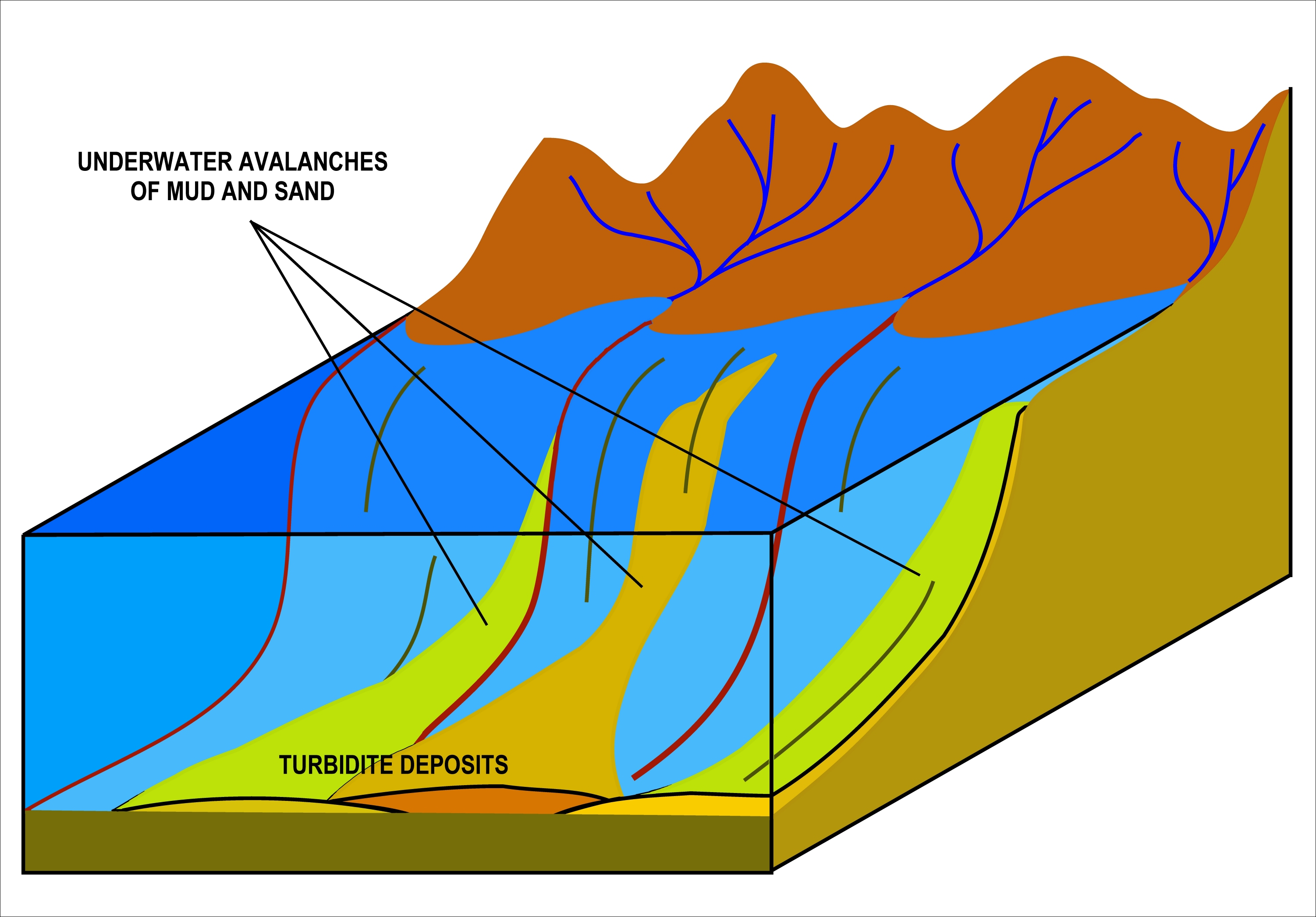
Turbidites are deposited in the deep ocean troughs below the continental shelf, or similar structures in deep lakes, by turbidity currents which slide down the slopes.

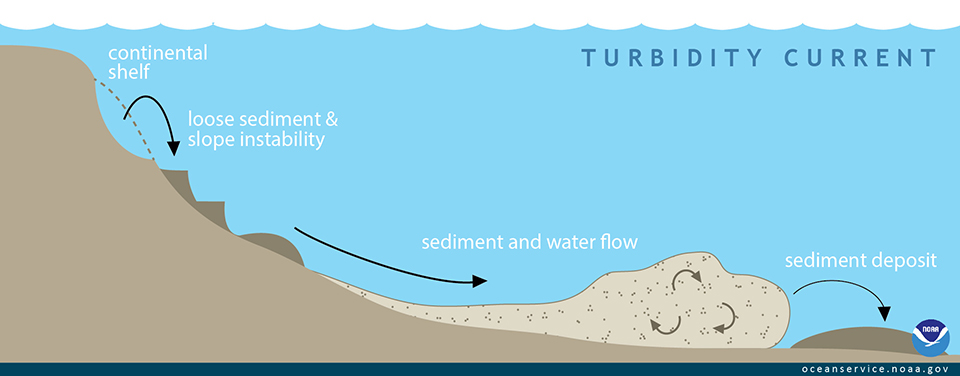
Longitudinal section through an underwater turbidity current

A turbidity current is most typically an underwater current of usually rapidly moving, sediment-laden water moving down a slope; although current research (2018) indicates that water-saturated sediment may be the primary actor in the process. Turbidity currents can also occur in other fluids besides water.

Researchers from the Monterey Bay Aquarium Research Institute found that a layer of water-saturated sediment moved rapidly over the seafloor and mobilized the upper few meters of the preexisting seafloor. Plumes of sediment-laden water were observed during turbidity current events but they believe that these were secondary to the pulse of the seafloor sediment moving during the events. The belief of the researchers is that the water flow is the tail-end of the process that starts at the seafloor.

In the most typical case of oceanic turbidity currents, sediment laden waters situated over sloping ground will flow down-hill because they have a higher density than the adjacent waters. The driving force behind a turbidity current is gravity acting on the high density of the sediments temporarily suspended within a fluid. These semi-suspended solids make the average density of the sediment bearing water greater than that of the surrounding, undisturbed water.

As such currents flow, they often have a "snow-balling-effect", as they stir up the ground over which they flow, and gather even more sedimentary particles in their current. Their passage leaves the ground over which they flow scoured and eroded. Once an oceanic turbidity current reaches the calmer waters of the flatter area of the abyssal plain (main oceanic floor), the particles borne by the current settle out of the water column. The sedimentary deposit of a turbidity current is called a turbidite.

Seafloor turbidity currents are often the result of sediment-laden river outflows, and can sometimes be initiated by earthquakes, slumping and other soil disturbances. They are characterized by a well-defined advance-front, also known as the current's head, and are followed by the current's main body. In terms of the more often observed and more familiar above sea-level phenomenon, they somewhat resemble flash floods.

Turbidity currents can sometimes result from submarine seismic instability, which is common with steep underwater slopes, and especially with submarine trench slopes of convergent plate margins, continental slopes and submarine canyons of passive margins. With an increasing continental shelf slope, current velocity increases, as the velocity of the flow increases, turbulence increases, and the current draws up more sediment. The increase in sediment also adds to the density of the current, and thus increases its velocity even further.

== Definition ==
Turbidity currents are traditionally defined as those sediment gravity flows in which sediment is suspended by fluid turbulence. However, the term "turbidity current" was adopted to describe a natural phenomenon whose exact nature is often unclear. The turbulence within a turbidity current is not always the support mechanism that keeps the sediment in suspension; however it is probable that turbulence is the primary or sole grain support mechanism in dilute currents (<3%). Definitions are further complicated by an incomplete understanding of the turbulence structure within turbidity currents, and the confusion between the terms turbulent (i.e. disturbed by eddies) and turbid (i.e. opaque with sediment). Kneller & Buckee, 2000 define a suspension current as 'flow induced by the action of gravity upon a turbid mixture of fluid and (suspended) sediment, by virtue of the density difference between the mixture and the ambient fluid'. A turbidity current is a suspension current in which the interstitial fluid is liquid (generally water); a pyroclastic current is one in which the interstitial fluid is gas.

== Triggers ==
=== Hyperpycnal plume ===
When the concentration of suspended sediment at the mouth of a river is so large that the density of river water is greater than the density of sea water a particular kind turbidity current can form where the sediment-laden freshwater from the river continues as a submarine current across the bottom of a lake or sea. This is called a hyperpycnal plume. The average concentration of suspended sediment for most river water that enters the ocean is much lower than the sediment concentration needed to form a hyperpycnal plume. Although some rivers can have continuously high sediment load that can create a continuous hyperpycnal plume, such as the Haile River (China), which has an average suspended concentration of 40.5 kg/m^{3}. The sediment concentration needed to produce a hyperpycnal plume in marine water is 35 to 45 kg/m^{3}, depending on the water properties within the coastal zone. Most rivers produce hyperpycnal flows only during exceptional events, such as storms, floods, glacier outbursts, dam breaks, and lahar flows. In fresh water environments, such as lakes, the suspended sediment concentration needed to produce a hyperpycnal plume is quite low (1 kg/m^{3}).

=== Sedimentation in reservoirs ===
The transport and deposition of the sediments in narrow alpine reservoirs is often caused by turbidity currents. They follow the thalweg of the lake to the deepest area near the dam, where the sediments can affect the operation of the bottom outlet and the intake structures. Controlling this sedimentation within the reservoir can be achieved by using solid and permeable obstacles with the right design.

=== Earthquake triggering ===
Turbidity currents are often triggered by tectonic disturbances of the sea floor. The displacement of continental crust in the form of fluidization and physical shaking both contribute to their formation. Earthquakes have been linked to turbidity current deposition in many settings, particularly where physiography favors preservation of the deposits and limits the other sources of turbidity current deposition. Since the famous case of breakage of submarine cables by a turbidity current following the 1929 Grand Banks earthquake, earthquake triggered turbidites have been investigated and verified along the Cascadia subduction Zone, the Northern San Andreas Fault, a number of European, Chilean and North American lakes, Japanese lacustrine and offshore regions and a variety of other settings.

=== Canyon-flushing ===
When large turbidity currents flow into canyons they may become self-sustaining, and may entrain sediment that has previously been introduced into the canyon by littoral drift, storms or smaller turbidity currents. Canyon-flushing associated with surge-type currents initiated by slope failures may produce currents whose final volume may be several times that of the portion of the slope that has failed (e.g. Grand Banks).

=== Slumping ===
Sediment that has piled up at the top of the continental slope, particularly at the heads of submarine canyons can create turbidity current due to overloading, thus consequent slumping and sliding.

=== Convective sedimentation beneath river plumes ===
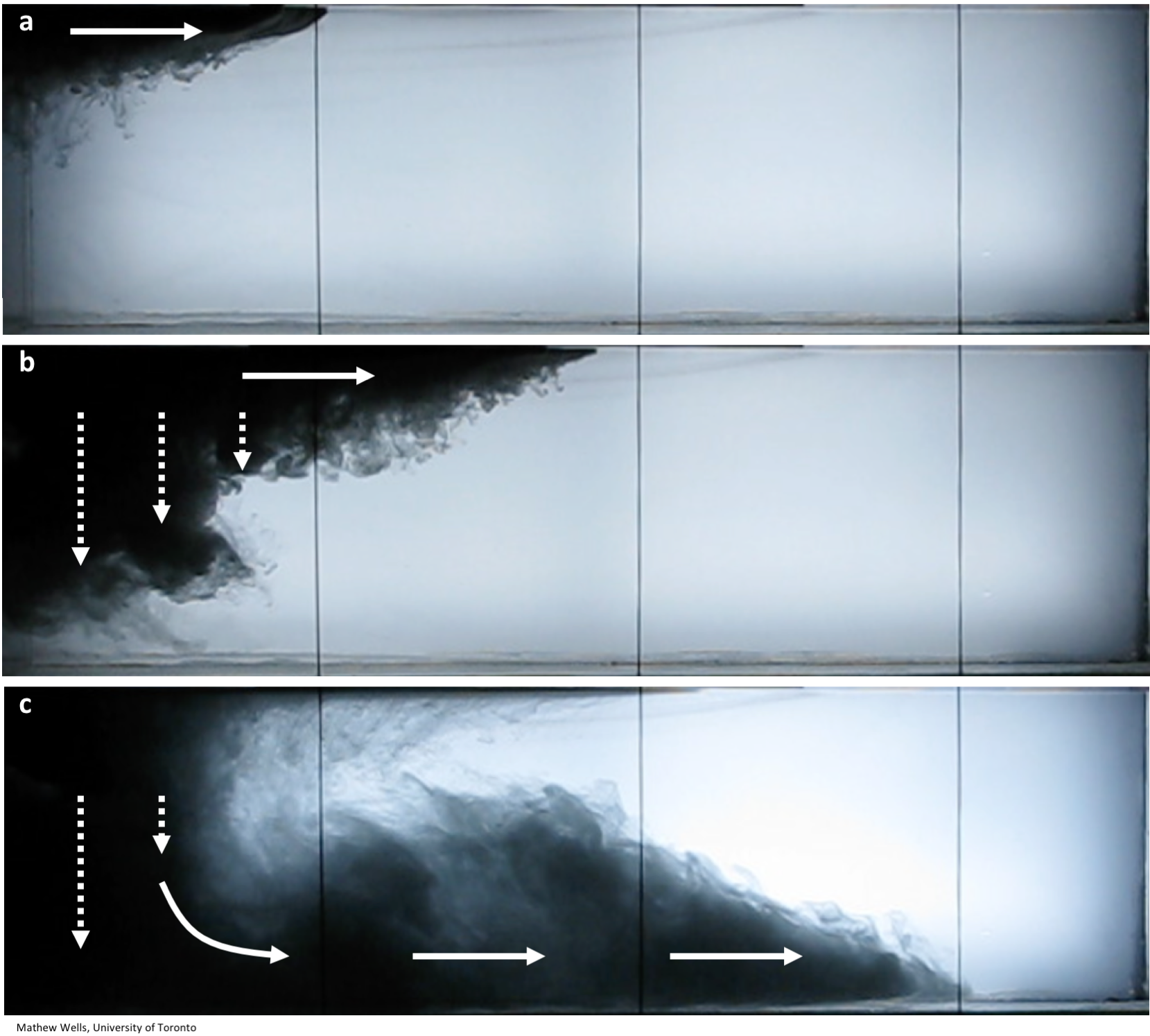
Laboratory images of how convective sedimentation beneath a buoyant sediment-laden surface can initiate a secondary turbidity current.

A buoyant sediment-laden river plume can induce a secondary turbidity current on the ocean floor by the process of convective sedimentation. Sediment in the initially buoyant hypopycnal flow accumulates at the base of the surface flow, so that the dense lower boundary become unstable. The resulting convective sedimentation leads to a rapid vertical transfer of material to the sloping lake or ocean bed, potentially forming a secondary turbidity current. The vertical speed of the convective plumes can be much greater than the Stokes settling velocity of an individual particle of sediment. Most examples of this process have been made in the laboratory, but possible observational evidence of a secondary turbidity current was made in Howe Sound, British Columbia, where a turbidity current was periodically observed on the delta of the Squamish River. As the vast majority of sediment laden rivers are less dense than the ocean, rivers cannot readily form plunging hyperpycnal flows. Hence convective sedimentation is an important possible initiation mechanism for turbidity currents.

An example of steep submarine canyons carved out by turbidity currents, located along California's Central Coast

== Effect on ocean floor ==
Large and fast-moving turbidity currents can carve gulleys and ravines into the ocean floor of continental margins and cause damage to artificial structures such as telecommunication cables on the seafloor. Understanding where turbidity currents flow on the ocean floor can help to decrease the amount of damage to telecommunication cables by avoiding these areas or reinforcing the cables in vulnerable areas.

When turbidity currents interact with regular ocean currents, such as contour currents, they can change their direction. This ultimately shifts submarine canyons and sediment deposition locations. One example of this is located in the western part of the Gulf of Cadiz, where the ocean current leaving the Mediterranean Sea (also known as the Mediterranean outflow water) pushes turbidity currents westward. This has changed the shape of submarine valleys and canyons in the region to also curve in that direction.

== Deposits ==
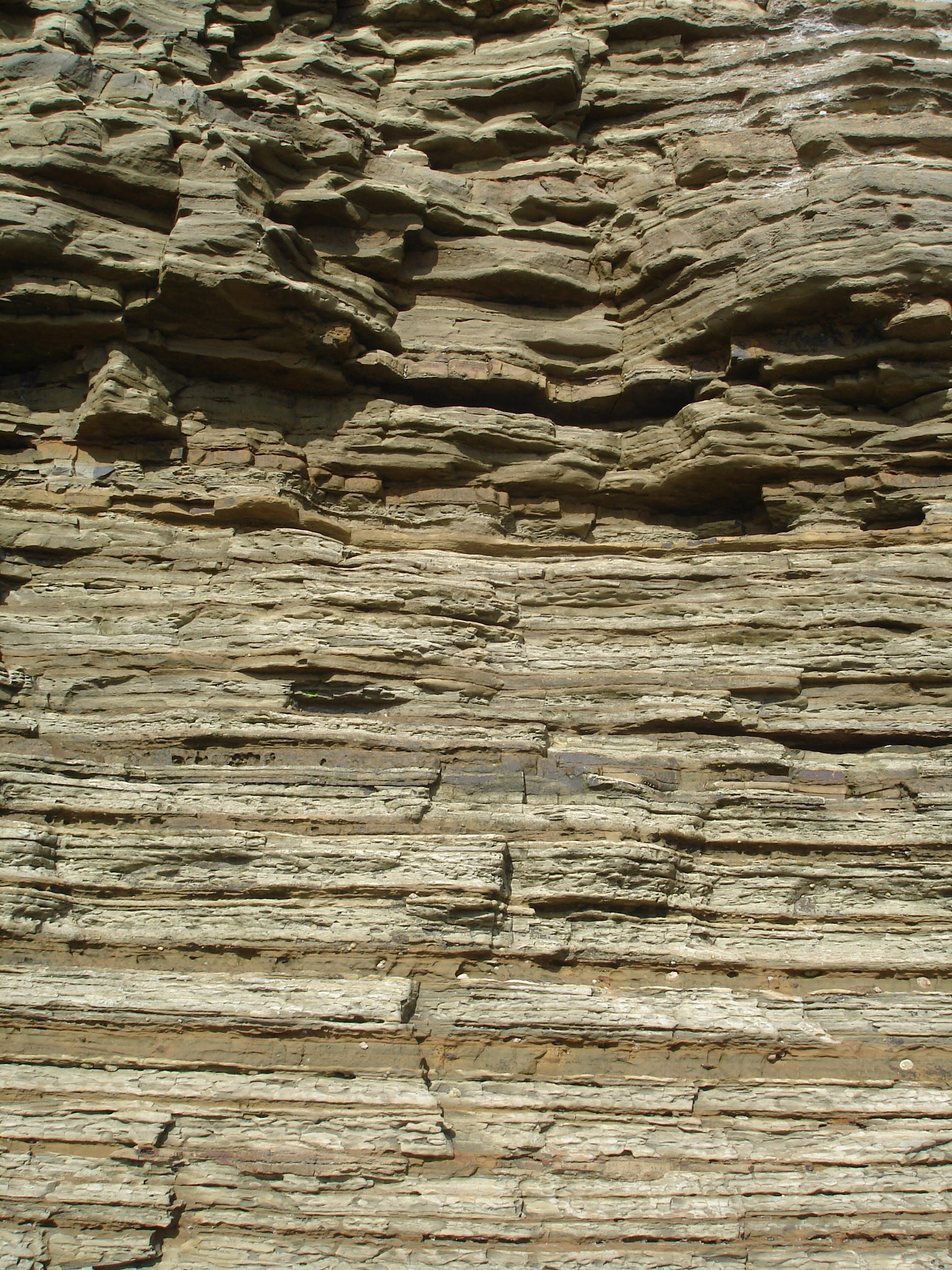
Turbidite interbedded with finegrained dusky-yellow sandstone and gray clay shale that occur in graded beds, Point Loma Formation, California.

When the energy of a turbidity current lowers, its ability to keep suspended sediment decreases, thus sediment deposition occurs. When the material comes to rest, it is the sand and other coarse material which settles first followed by mud and eventually the very fine particulate matter. It is this sequence of deposition that creates the so called Bouma sequences that characterize turbidite deposits.

Because turbidity currents occur underwater and happen suddenly, they are rarely seen as they happen in nature, thus turbidites can be used to determine turbidity current characteristics. Some examples: grain size can give indication of current velocity, grain lithology and the use of foraminifera for determining origins, grain distribution shows flow dynamics over time and sediment thickness indicates sediment load and longevity.

Turbidites are commonly used in the understanding of past turbidity currents, for example, the Peru-Chile Trench off Southern Central Chile (36°S–39°S) contains numerous turbidite layers that were cored and analysed. From these turbidites the predicted history of turbidity currents in this area was determined, increasing the overall understanding of these currents.

=== Antidune deposits ===
Some of the largest antidunes on Earth are formed by turbidity currents. One observed sediment-wave field is located on the lower continental slope off Guyana, South America. This sediment-wave field covers an area of at least 29 000 km^{2} at a water depth of 4400–4825 meters. These antidunes have wavelengths of 110–2600 m and wave heights of 1–15 m. Turbidity currents responsible for wave generation are interpreted as originating from slope failures on the adjacent Venezuela, Guyana and Suriname continental margins. Simple numerical modelling has been enabled to determine turbidity current flow characteristics across the sediment waves to be estimated: internal Froude number = 0.7–1.1, flow thickness = 24–645 m, and flow velocity = 31–82 cm·s^{−1}. Generally, on lower gradients beyond minor breaks of slope, flow thickness increases and flow velocity decreases, leading to an increase in wavelength and a decrease in height.

== Reversing buoyancy ==
The behaviour of turbidity currents with buoyant fluid (such as currents with warm, fresh or brackish interstitial water entering the sea) has been investigated to find that the front speed decreases more rapidly than that of currents with the same density as the ambient fluid. These turbidity currents ultimately come to a halt as sedimentation results in a reversal of buoyancy, and the current lifts off, the point of lift-off remaining constant for a constant discharge. The lofted fluid carries fine sediment with it, forming a plume that rises to a level of neutral buoyancy (if in a stratified environment) or to the water surface, and spreads out. Sediment falling from the plume produces a widespread fall-out deposit, termed hemiturbidite. Experimental turbidity currents and field observations suggest that the shape of the lobe deposit formed by a lofting plume is narrower than for a similar non-lofting plume

== Prediction ==
Prediction of erosion by turbidity currents, and of the distribution of turbidite deposits, such as their extent, thickness and grain size distribution, requires an understanding of the mechanisms of sediment transport and deposition, which in turn depends on the fluid dynamics of the currents.

The extreme complexity of most turbidite systems and beds has promoted the development of quantitative models of turbidity current behaviour inferred solely from their deposits. Small-scale laboratory experiments therefore offer one of the best means of studying their dynamics. Mathematical models can also provide significant insights into current dynamics. In the long term, numerical techniques are most likely the best hope of understanding and predicting three-dimensional turbidity current processes and deposits. In most cases, there are more variables than governing equations, and the models rely upon simplifying assumptions in order to achieve a result. The accuracy of the individual models thus depends upon the validity and choice of the assumptions made. Experimental results provide a means of constraining some of these variables as well as providing a test for such models. Physical data from field observations, or more practical from experiments, are still required in order to test the simplifying assumptions necessary in mathematical models. Most of what is known about large natural turbidity currents (i.e. those significant in terms of sediment transfer to the deep sea) is inferred from indirect sources, such as submarine cable breaks and heights of deposits above submarine valley floors. Although during the 2003 Tokachi-oki earthquake a large turbidity current was observed by the cabled observatory which provided direct observations, which is rarely achieved.

=== Oil exploration ===
Oil and gas companies are also interested in turbidity currents because the currents deposit organic matter that over geologic time gets buried, compressed and transformed into hydrocarbons. The use of numerical modelling and flumes are commonly used to help understand these questions. Much of the modelling is used to reproduce the physical processes which govern turbidity current behaviour and deposits.

=== Modeling approaches ===
==== Shallow-water models ====
The so-called depth-averaged or shallow-water models are initially introduced for compositional gravity currents and then later extended to turbidity currents. The typical assumptions used along with the shallow-water models are: hydrostatic pressure field, clear fluid is not entrained (or detrained), and particle concentration does not depend on the vertical location. Considering the ease of implementation, these models can typically predict flow characteristic such as front location or front speed in simplified geometries, e.g. rectangular channels, fairly accurately.

==== Depth-resolved models ====
With the increase in computational power, depth-resolved models have become a powerful tool to study gravity and turbidity currents. These models, in general, are mainly focused on the solution of the Navier-Stokes equations for the fluid phase. With dilute suspension of particles, a Eulerian approach proved to be accurate to describe the evolution of particles in terms of a set of continuum particle concentration fields each representing one unique particle kind of density and/or diameter. Under these models, no such assumptions as shallow-water models are needed and, therefore, accurate calculations and measurements are performed to study these currents. Measurements such as, pressure field, energy budgets, vertical particle concentration and accurate deposit heights are a few to mention. Both Direct numerical simulation (DNS) and Turbulence modeling are used to model these currents.

== Notable examples of turbidity currents ==
- Within minutes after the 1929 Grand Banks earthquake occurred off the coast of Newfoundland, transatlantic telephone cables began breaking sequentially, farther and farther downslope, away from the epicenter. Twelve cables were snapped in a total of 28 places. Exact times and locations were recorded for each break. Investigators suggested that an estimated 60 mile per hour (100 km/h) submarine landslide or turbidity current of water saturated sediments swept 400 miles (600 km) down the continental slope from the earthquake's epicenter, snapping the cables as it passed. Subsequent research of this event have shown that continental slope sediment failures mostly occurred below 650 meter water depth. The slumping that occurred in shallow waters (5–25 meters) passed down slope into turbidity currents that evolved ignitively. The turbidity currents had sustained flow for many hours due to the delayed retrogressive failure and transformation of debris flows into turbidity currents through hydraulic jumps.
- The Cascadia subduction zone, off the northwestern coast of North America, has a record of earthquake triggered turbidites that is well-correlated to other evidence of earthquakes recorded in coastal bays and lakes during the Holocene. Forty–one Holocene turbidity currents have been correlated along all or part of the approximately 1000 km long plate boundary stretching from northern California to mid-Vancouver island. The correlations are based on radiocarbon ages and subsurface stratigraphic methods. The inferred recurrence interval of Cascadia great earthquakes is approximately 500 years along the northern margin, and approximately 240 years along the southern margin.
- Taiwan is a hot spot for submarine turbidity currents as there are large amounts of sediment suspended in rivers, and it is seismically active, thus large accumulation of seafloor sediments and earthquake triggering. During the 2006 Pingtung earthquake off SW Taiwan, eleven submarine cables across the Kaoping canyon and Manila Trench were broken in sequence from 1500 to 4000 m deep, as a consequence of the associated turbidity currents. From the timing of each cable break the velocity of the current was determined to have a positive relationship with bathymetric slope. Current velocities were 20 m/s (45 mph) on the steepest slopes and 3.7 m/s (8.3 mph) on the shallowest slopes.
- One of the earliest observations of a turbidity currents was by François-Alphonse Forel. In the late 1800s he made detailed observations of the plunging of the Rhône river into Lake Geneva at Port Valais. These papers were possibly the earliest identification of a turbidity current and he discussed how the submarine channel formed from the delta. In this freshwater lake, it is primarily the cold water that leads to plunging of the inflow. The sediment load by itself is generally not high enough to overcome the summer thermal stratification in Lake Geneva.
- The longest turbidity current ever recorded occurred in January 2020 and flowed for 1,100 kilometers (680 mi) through the Congo Canyon over the course of two days, damaging two submarine communications cables. The current was a result of sediment deposited by the 2019–2020 Congo River floods.

== See also ==
- Bouma sequence
- Gravity current
- High-density turbidity currents (Lowe sequence)
- Submarine landslide
- Sediment gravity flows
