= Antidune =

Bedform in channeled environments

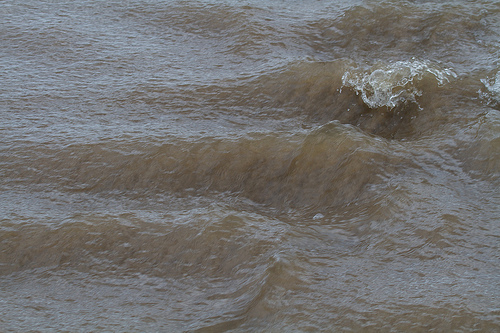
Surface waves forming in phase above antidunes in a small stream. Water flow is away from the camera.

An antidune is a bedform found in fluvial and other channeled environments. Antidunes occur in supercritical flow, meaning that the Froude number is greater than 1.0 or the flow velocity exceeds the wave velocity; this is also known as upper flow regime. In antidunes, sediment is deposited on the upstream (stoss) side and eroded from the downstream (lee) side, opposite lower flow regime bedforms. As a result, antidunes migrate in an upstream direction, counter to the current flow. Antidunes are called in-phase bedforms, meaning that the water surface elevation mimics the bed elevation; this is due to the supercritical flow regime. Antidune bedforms evolve rapidly, growing in amplitude as they migrate upstream. The resultant wave at the water's surface also increases in amplitude. When that wave becomes unstable, breaks and washes downstream, much of the antidune bedform may be destroyed.

== Formation ==
Water flowing over bedforms in sand under unidirectional flow to the right. Numbers correspond broadly to increasing flow regime, i.e., increasing water flow velocity. For dunes, the water surface is low over the dune and high over the interdune. For antidunes, flow depth is roughly the same everywhere, which means the water surface is high over the antidune and low over the interdune.

Antidunes are typically found in fluvial environments in shallow areas with a high flow rate. Unlike ripples and dunes in lower flow regime, antidunes are generally symmetric and migrate counter to the flow direction. Antidunes evolve rapidly, growing in amplitude as they migrate against the current. When the surface wave above them becomes unstable and breaks (when the surface wave amplitude reaches 1/7 its wavelength) most of the antidune bedform is destroyed and its sediment carried down stream.

Antidunes are commonly observed in small streams that flow across beaches into the ocean. Flume studies have shown that they can also occur in submarine environments beneath density flows like turbidity currents. Antidunes produce sedimentary structures characteristic of their flow regime, which allow sedimentary geologists to understand past flow conditions. Unlike low flow regime bedforms like dunes and ripples which generally produce downstream dipping cross stratification, antidunes produce a mixture of low-angle downstream and upstream dipping strata. While antidunes migrate upstream, upstream dipping cross-stratification is not indicative of antidunes or upper flow regime conditions. If the Froude number is high enough, cyclic steps may form instead of antidunes.

Antidunes migrate upstream because the stream flow is shallow and fast in the trough and slows and deepens over the crest. As a result, the shear stress on the bed decreases from trough to crest, allowing sedimentation, and increases from crest to tough, causing erosion. The inertia of the flow moves the shear stress maximum and minimum slightly downstream of the trough and crest. This allows the bedform to amplify with time as erosion occurs in the trough and deposition occurs at the crest.

Christopher R. Fielding observed a link between their formation and the climate. Climates that have extreme rainy seasons resulting in runoff create a higher flow velocity within their streams and rivers, thus increasing the ability of upper flow regime structures to form.

== History ==
In 1899 the first description of antidunes was presented by Vaughan Cornish to the Royal Geographical Society. He observed that while water was flowing down stream waves occurred that traveled up stream depositing sand and other material. This observation was later validated by John S. Owens in 1908. The term antidune was coined by G.K. Gilbert in a 1914 US Geological Survey Professional Paper entitled “Transportation of debris by running water”. He wrote this report in conjunction with E. C. Murphy, their description of antidunes and stationary waves that expanded on Cornish and Owens' previous report. Their information was gathered during a laboratory investigation sponsored by the U.S. Geological Survey. The first person to attempt an analytical description of antidunes was Walter B. Langbein in 1942. He applied dimensional analysis to Gilberts' results and came up with transition points using Froude numbers versus velocity and hydraulic radius.
