= Contour currents =

The term contour currents was first introduced by Heezen et al in 1966 as bottom currents along the continental shelf driven by Coriolis effects and temperature/salinity dependent density gradients. Generally, the currents flow along depth contours, hence called contour currents. Sediments deposited and shaped by the contour currents are called contourites, which are commonly observed in continental rise.

== Depositional Processes ==
Since contour currents generally flow at speed of 2–20 cm/s, their capacity to carry sediments is limited to fine grain particles already in suspension. Redistribution of sediments by contour currents have, however, been reported as evidenced by the sea floor morphological features parallel to regional isobaths. Turbidity currents, on the other hand, flow down slope across regional isobaths and are mainly responsible for supplying terrigenous sediment across continental margins to deep-water environments, such as continental rise, where fine particles are further carried in suspension by contour currents. The joint depositional processes of the two current systems contribute to the dominant factors influencing the morphology of the lower continental margins.
